= List of ambassadors and high commissioners of South Africa to the United Kingdom =

High Commissioner of South Africa to the United Kingdom
- Incumbent; Jeremiah Nyamane Mamabolo since 2022
- Style: His Excellency
- Appointer: Cyril Ramaphosa
- Inaugural holder: Sir Richard Solomon
- Formation: June 1910
- Website: South African High Commission, London

The high commissioner of South Africa to the United Kingdom is an officer of the South African Department of International Relations and Cooperation and the head of the High Commission of the Republic of South Africa to the United Kingdom in London. The position has the rank and status of an ambassador extraordinary and plenipotentiary and also serves as South Africa's permanent representative to the International Maritime Organization (since 1959), a trustee of the Imperial War Museum and South Africa's Commonwealth War Graves Commissioner.

The high commissioner is currently Jeremiah Nyamane Mamabolo. On South Africa's departure from the Commonwealth of Nations in 1961, the High Commission became an Embassy. Following the end of Apartheid and South Africa's return to the Commonwealth on 1 June 1994, the High Commission was re-established to replace the former embassy.

== Office-holders ==
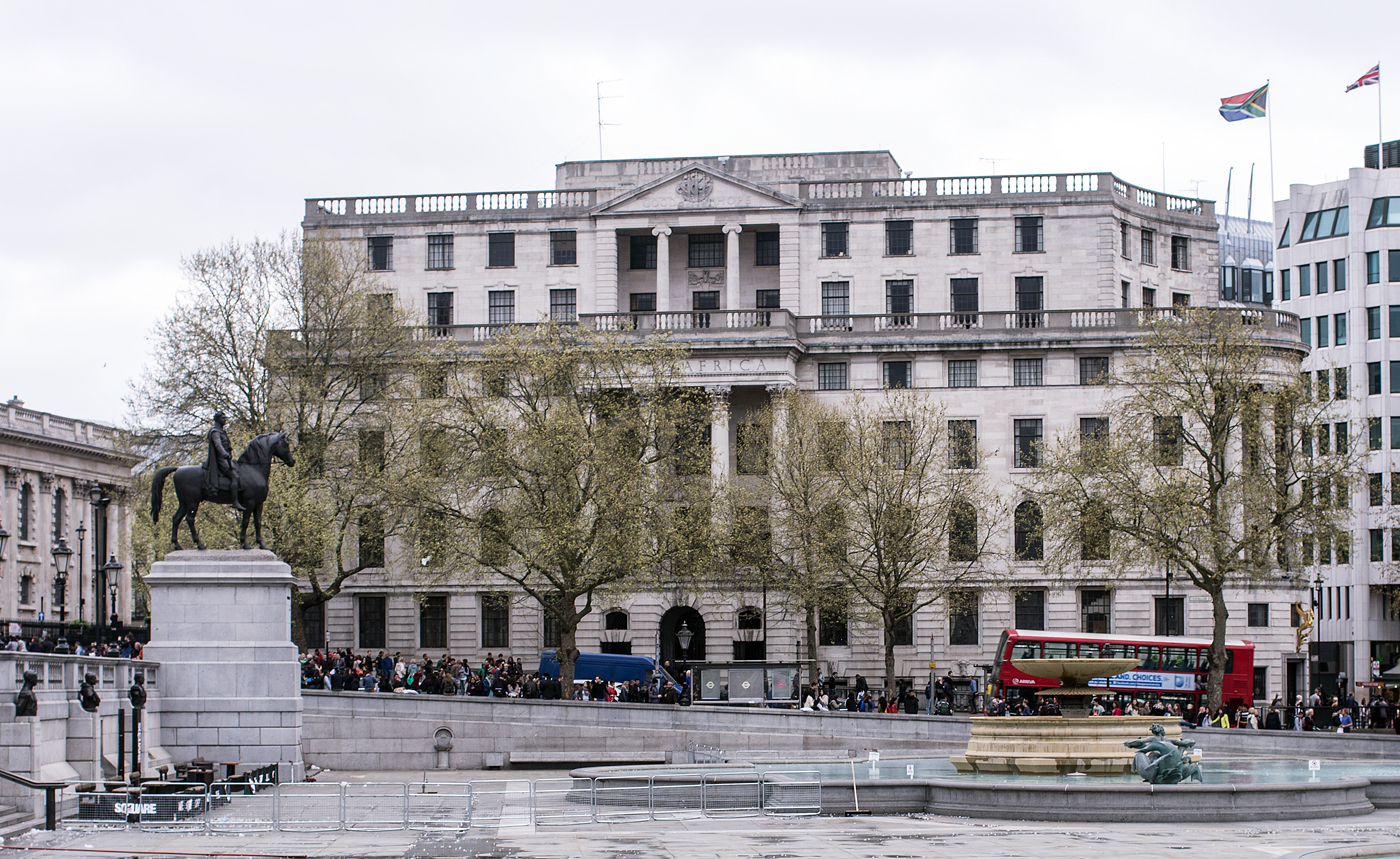
The South African High Commission on Trafalgar Square.

=== High commissioners from the Union of South Africa, 1910–61 ===
Incumbent	Start of term	End of term	Notes
Sir Richard Solomon	June 1910	10 November 1913	
Sir David Graaff	August 1914	November 1914	
William Schreiner	November 1914	28 June 1919	
Sir Reginald Blankenberg (Chargé d'affaires)	28 June 1919	February 1921	
Sir Edgar Walton	February 1921	September 1924	
Jacobus Stephanus Smit	September 1924	March 1929	
Eric Louw	March 1929	November 1929	
Charles Theodore Te Water	November 1929	September 1939	
Sidney Frank Waterson	September 1939	June 1943	
Deneys Reitz	December 1942	19 October 1944	
George Heaton Nicholls	1944	1947	
Leif Egeland	March 1948	1950	
Albertus Lourens Geyer	May 1950	June 1954	
Gerhardus Petrus Jooste	September 1954	1956	
John Edward Holloway	1956	1958	
A. J. R. van Rhijn	1959	1960	
Hilgard Muller	1961	30 May 1961	

=== Ambassadors from the Republic of South Africa, 1961–94 ===
Appointed by the State President of South Africa upon constitutional advice of the Prime Minister of South Africa from 1961, then directly appointed by the State President alone until 1994.

Incumbent	Start of term	End of term	Notes
Hilgard Muller	31 May 1961	1963	
Carel de Wet	1964	1967	
Hendrik Gerhardus Luttig	1967	1972	
Carel de Wet	1972	1979	
Dawie de Villiers	April 1979	October 1980	
Carel de Wet	1980	1983	
Denis Worrall	1984	1987	
Peter Rae Killen	5 February 1987	1991	
Kent Durr	15 April 1991	31 May 1994	

=== High commissioners from the Republic of South Africa, since 1 June 1994 ===
Appointed directly by the President of South Africa.

Incumbent	Start of term	End of term	Notes
Mendi Msimang	1995	1997	
Cheryl Carolus	2 March 1998	2001	
Lindiwe Mabuza	2001	2010	
Zola Skweyiya	2010	2014	
Obed Mlaba	2014	2017	
Nomatemba Tambo	2018	2022	
Jeremiah Nyamane Mamabolo	2022	date	

== See also ==
- South Africa–United Kingdom relations
- List of high commissioners of the United Kingdom to South Africa
