= Beaufort West (House of Assembly of South Africa constituency) =

Former South African constituency

- Beaufort-Wes
- Former constituency for the South African House of Assembly
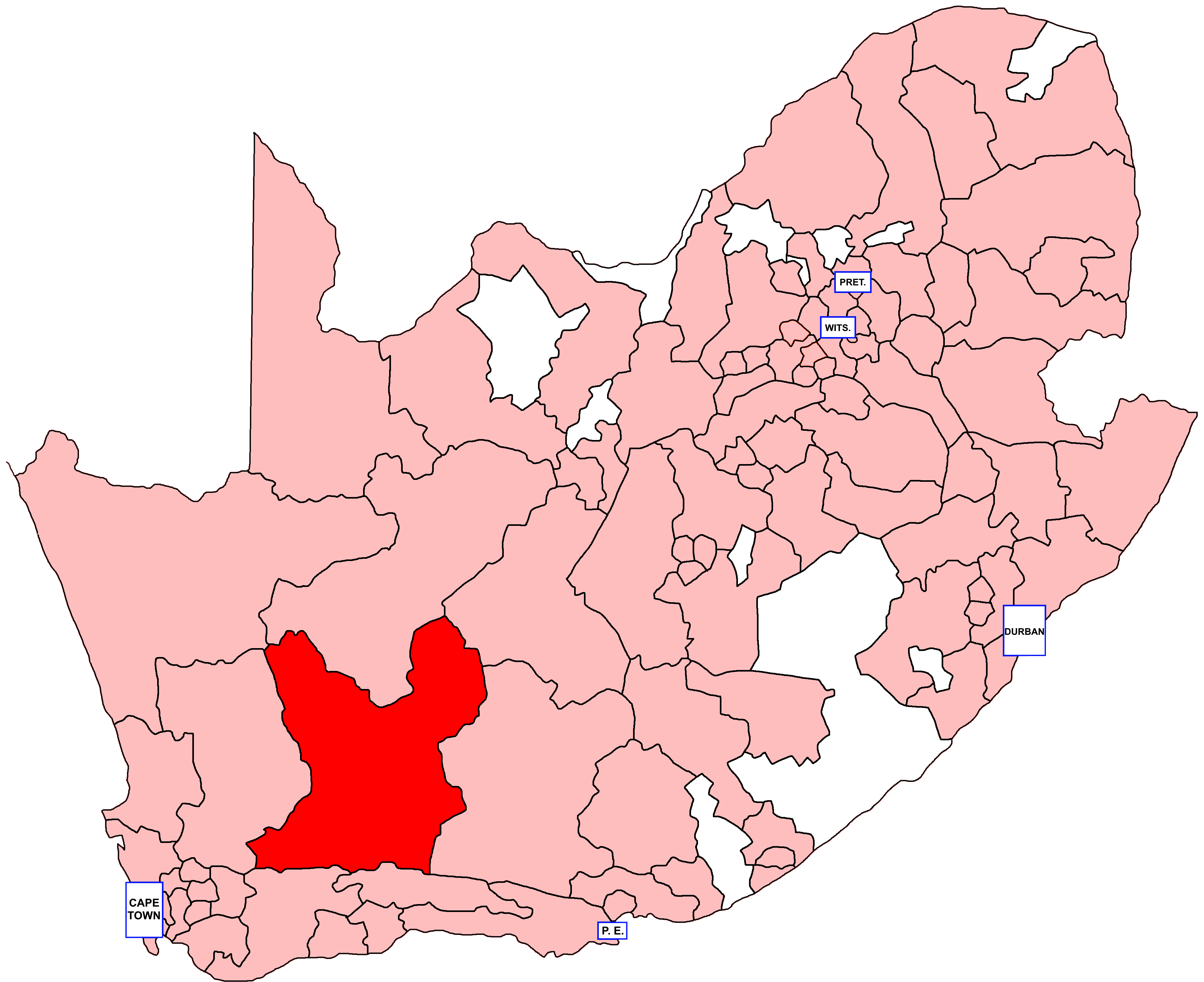
- Location of Beaufort West within South Africa (1981)
- Province: Cape of Good Hope
- Electorate: 8,919 (1989)

Former constituency
- Created: 1910
- Abolished: 1994
- Number of members: 1
- Last MHA: A. C. Cloete (NP)
- Replaced by: Western Cape

Beaufort West (Afrikaans: Beaufort-Wes) was a constituency in the Cape Province of South Africa, which existed from 1910 to 1994. It covered a large area of the Karoo, centred on the town of Beaufort West. Throughout its existence it elected one member to the House of Assembly and one to the Cape Provincial Council.

== Franchise notes ==
When the Union of South Africa was formed in 1910, the electoral qualifications in use in each pre-existing colony were kept in place. The Cape Colony had implemented a “colour-blind” franchise known as the Cape Qualified Franchise, which included all adult literate men owning more than £75 worth of property (controversially raised from £25 in 1892), and this initially remained in effect after the colony became the Cape Province. As of 1908, 22,784 out of 152,221 electors in the Cape Colony were “Native or Coloured”. Eligibility to serve in Parliament and the Provincial Council, however, was restricted to whites from 1910 onward.

The first challenge to the Cape Qualified Franchise came with the Women's Enfranchisement Act, 1930 and the Franchise Laws Amendment Act, 1931, which extended the vote to women and removed property qualifications for the white population only – non-white voters remained subject to the earlier restrictions. In 1936, the Representation of Natives Act removed all black voters from the common electoral roll and introduced three “Native Representative Members”, white MPs elected by the black voters of the province and meant to represent their interests in particular. A similar provision was made for Coloured voters with the Separate Representation of Voters Act, 1951, and although this law was challenged by the courts, it went into effect in time for the 1958 general election, which was thus held with all-white voter rolls for the first time in South African history. The all-white franchise would continue until the end of apartheid and the introduction of universal suffrage in 1994.

== History ==
As with most of the Karoo, the electorate of Beaufort West was largely Afrikaans-speaking, and the seat was a stronghold of the National Party and its predecessors. With the exception of the 1910 and 1915 elections, in which it was held by the South African Party, the NP won Beaufort West every time the seat was contested. Its most notable MP, Eric Louw, was first elected in 1924, then represented the seat from 1938 to 1963. He was known as an antisemite and a member of the NP's radical wing, and in 1938 represented the Purified National Party. He retired from politics in 1963, and his successor as Foreign Affairs Minister, Hilgard Muller, won the seat. Beaufort West was held unopposed by the NP for much of the 1960s and 70s, but in 1987 and 1989 saw contests by the Conservative Party. However, as in much of the Cape, the Conservatives were never successful in taking the seat.

== Members ==
Election	Member	Party
1910	A. M. Neethling	SAP
1915	O. A. Oosthuizen	SAP
1920	P. W. le Roux	National
1921	P. W. le Roux	National
1924	Eric Louw	National
1925 by	P. N. Basson	National
1929	P. N. Basson	National
1933	P. N. Basson	National
1938	Eric Louw	GNP
1943	Eric Louw	HNP
1948	Eric Louw	HNP
1953	Eric Louw	National
1958	Eric Louw	National
1961	Eric Louw	National
1964 by	Hilgard Muller	National
1966	Hilgard Muller	National
1970	Hilgard Muller	National
1974	Hilgard Muller	National
1977	J. H. Nortje	National
1979 by	D. J. Poggenpoel	National
1981	D. J. Poggenpoel	National
1987	P. F. Hugo	National
1989	A. C. Cloete	National
1994	constituency abolished	

== Detailed results ==
=== Elections in the 1910s ===
General election 1910: Beaufort West
Party	Candidate	Votes	%	±%
South African	A. M. Neethling	Unopposed		
South African win (new seat)				

General election 1915: Beaufort West
Party	Candidate	Votes	%	±%
South African	O. A. Oosthuizen	1,536	50.9	N/A
National	W. A. Hofmeyr	1,480	49.1	New
Majority		56	1.8	N/A
Turnout		3,016	81.7	N/A
South African hold		Swing	N/A	

=== Elections in the 1920s ===
General election 1920: Beaufort West
Party	Candidate	Votes	%	±%
National	P. W. le Roux	1,648	61.5	+12.4
South African	P. B. van der Westhuizen	1,032	38.5	−12.4
Majority		612	23.0	N/A
Turnout		2,680	76.1	−5.6
National gain from South African		Swing	+12.4	

General election 1921: Beaufort West
Party	Candidate	Votes	%	±%
National	P. W. le Roux	1,605	51.5	−10.0
South African	M. J. de Jager	1,512	48.5	+10.0
Majority		93	3.0	−20.0
Turnout		3,117	82.6	+6.5
National hold		Swing	-10.0	

General election 1924: Beaufort West
Party	Candidate	Votes	%	±%
National	Eric Louw	1,727	61.7	+10.2
South African	W. van der Byl	1,046	37.4	−11.1
Rejected ballots		25	0.9	N/A
Majority		93	24.3	+21.3
Turnout		2,798	85.1	+2.5
National hold		Swing	+10.7	

Beaufort West by-election, 9 December 1925
Party	Candidate	Votes	%	±%
National	P. N. Basson	1,728	71.2	+8.9
South African	I. M. Nel	698	28.8	−8.9
Majority		1,030	42.4	+17.8
Turnout		2,426	76.1	−8.2
National hold		Swing	+8.9	

General election 1929: Beaufort West
Party	Candidate	Votes	%	±%
National	P. N. Basson	1,590	65.5	+3.8
Independent	K. D. Haak	802	33.0	New
Rejected ballots		35	1.5	N/A
Majority		93	33.0	N/A
Turnout		2,427	79.6	−4.7
National hold		Swing	N/A	

=== Elections in the 1930s ===
General election 1933: Beaufort West
Party	Candidate	Votes	%	±%
National	P. N. Basson	Unopposed		
National hold				

General election 1938: Beaufort West
Party	Candidate	Votes	%	±%
Purified National	Eric Louw	3,347	63.5	N/A
United	V. de Villiers	1,873	35.6	New
Rejected ballots		47	0.9	N/A
Majority		1,474	28.0	N/A
Turnout		5,267	84.0	N/A
Purified National hold		Swing	N/A	

=== Elections in the 1940s ===
General election 1943: Beaufort West
Party	Candidate	Votes	%	±%
Reunited National	Eric Louw	4,015	65.4	+1.3
United	H. Nel	2,122	34.6	−1.3
Majority		1,893	30.8	+2.6
Turnout		6,137	79.4	−3.8
Reunited National hold		Swing	+1.3	

General election 1948: Beaufort West
Party	Candidate	Votes	%	±%
Reunited National	Eric Louw	5,154	65.5	+0.1
United	J. van A. Steytler	2,719	34.5	−0.1
Majority		1,893	31.0	+0.2
Turnout		7,873	84.7	+5.3
Reunited National hold		Swing	+0.1	
