= Argentina–South Africa relations =

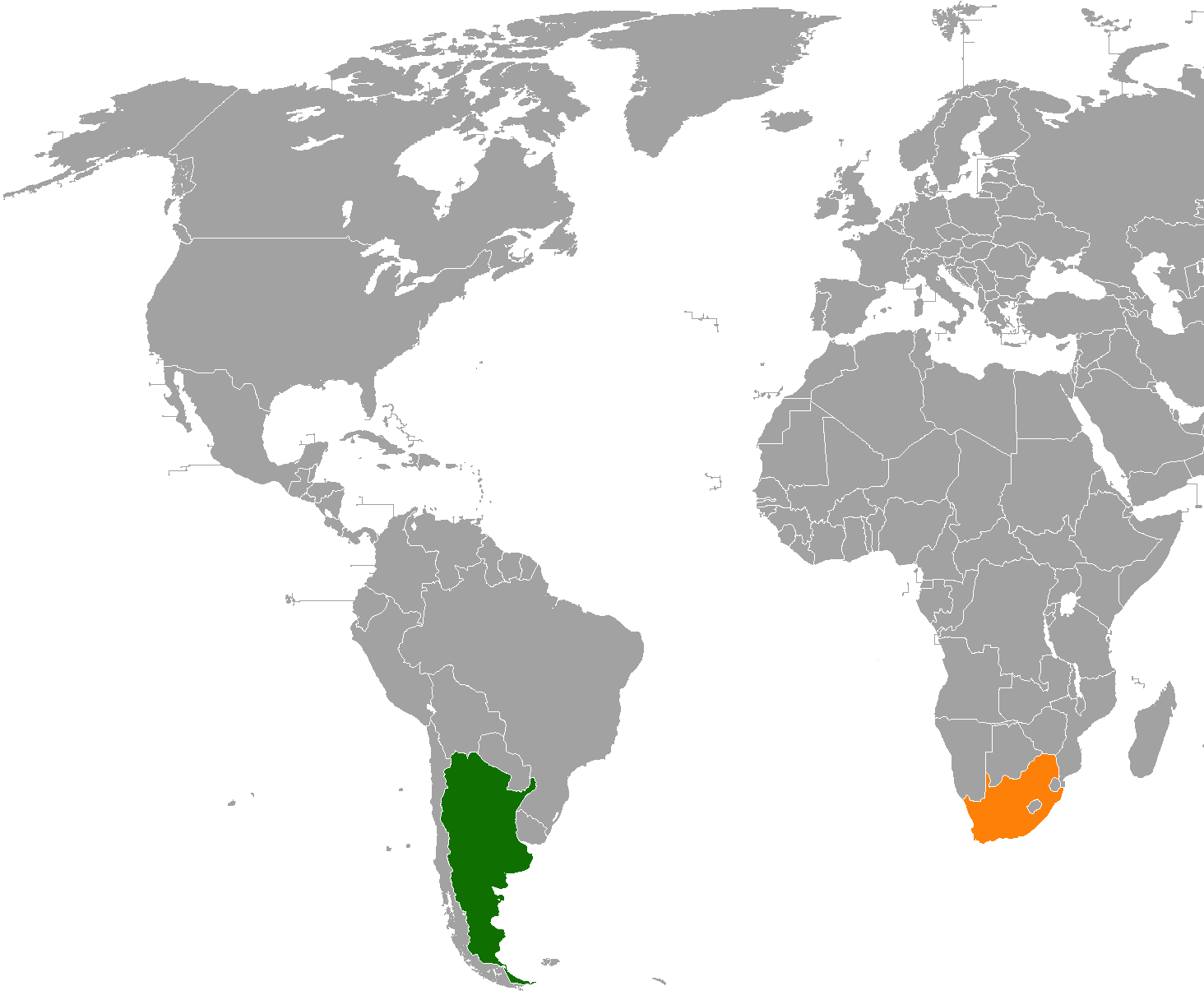
- Argentina: South Africa

The current and historical relations between the Argentine Republic and the Republic of South Africa, for over a century. Both nations are members of the Cairns Group, G20, Group of 77 and the United Nations.

== History ==
Early contacts between Argentina and South Africa took place in 1902 when a colony of 600 Afrikaners South Africans arrived to Argentina after the Second Boer War to settle in the Chubut Province as they refused to live under British domain. About half of the original contingent of 600 families returned to South Africa in 1938 as part of the “Groot Trek” celebrations.

In 1938, South Africa opened a consulate in Buenos Aires. On 10 September 1947 both nations established diplomatic relations. In 1948, South Africa opened a diplomatic legation in Buenos Aires, and in 1950, Argentina followed suit by opening a diplomatic legation in Pretoria. In 1960, both nations upgraded their legations to embassies.

In 1948, the South African government implemented Apartheid in the country. Initially, the Argentine government protested against apartheid and lowered diplomatic relations with South Africa, however, Argentina never broke diplomatic relations with South Africa and both nations maintained strong military and economic ties, thus creating an ambiguous relationship. In the 1970s, there were regular flights between both nations. In 1966, South African Foreign Minister Hilgard Muller paid a visit to Argentina.

Between 1976 and 1983, Argentina was under a military dictatorship. Between this time period, both nations were under international scrutiny and developed a closer partnership. Many nations compared Argentina's Dirty War with South Africa's apartheid. During the Falklands War between Argentina and the United Kingdom (April–June 1982), Argentina tried to detach itself from South Africa and approached the Non-Aligned Movement as part of a policy to win votes and support in the United Nations, and the Argentine government spoke out against apartheid; however, it continued to maintain close bilateral relations with the South African government. Argentina lost the war and the military dictatorship fell. Soon afterwards, democracy was restored in Argentina, flights between both nations were suspended in 1983 and the level of diplomatic relations reduced to below ambassadorial level. Between 1986 and 1991, Argentina's diplomatic relations with South Africa were suspended.

In August 1991, relations between both nations were restored. In 1995, Argentine President Carlos Menem paid a visit to South Africa and met with President Nelson Mandela. In July 1998, President Nelson Mandela paid an official visit to Argentina. During his visit, President Mandela addressed Argentina's Joint House of Congress.

Bilateral relations between Argentina and South Africa remain sound and the various common ideals and objectives of the two governments provide a potential basis for enhanced bilateral relations as well as for cooperation at the multilateral level. In 2013, Argentina adopted 18 July as International Nelson Mandela Day. In July 2018, Argentine President Mauricio Macri paid a visit to Johannesburg, South Africa to attend the 10th BRICS summit. In November 2018, South African President Cyril Ramaphosa paid a visit to Argentina to attend the G20 Summit in Buenos Aires.

== High-level visits ==
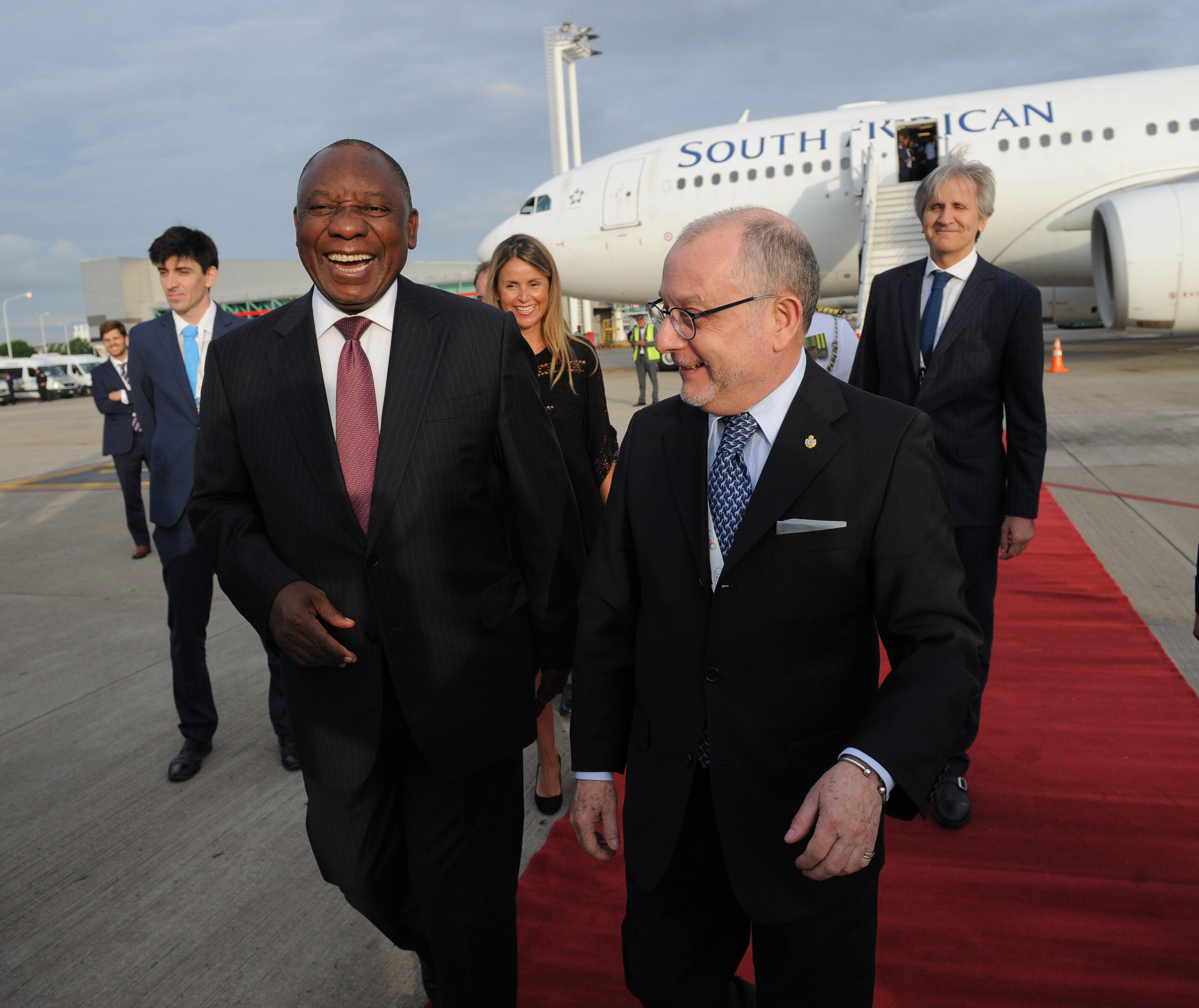
South African President Cyril Ramaphosa along with Argentine Foreign Minister Jorge Faurie, on his arrival to Argentina to attend the G20 Summit in Buenos Aires; November 2018.

High-level visits from Argentina to South Africa

- Foreign Minister Guido Di Tella (1994)
- President Carlos Menem (1995)
- Vice President Carlos Ruckauf (1996)
- Foreign Minister Jorge Taiana (2007)
- Foreign Minister Héctor Timerman (2012)
- Vice President Amado Boudou (2013)
- President Mauricio Macri (2018)

High-level visits from South Africa to Argentina

- Foreign Minister Hilgard Muller (1966, 1969)
- President FW De Klerk (1993)
- Vice President FW De Klerk (1994)
- Deputy Foreign Minister Aziz Pahad (1996, 2001)
- Vice President Thabo Mbeki (1997)
- President Nelson Mandela (1998)
- Foreign Minister Nkosazana Dlamini Zuma (1999, 2008)
- Minister of Trade and Industry Rob Davies (2011)
- Foreign Minister Maite Nkoana-Mashabane (2013)
- Foreign Minister Lindiwe Sisulu (2018)
- President Cyril Ramaphosa (2018)
- Deputy Foreign Minister Luwellyn Landers (2019)

== Bilateral agreements ==
Both nations have signed several agreements such as a Treaty of Friendship, Navigation and Commerce (1890); Agreement for Peacetime Cooperation between their respective Navies (1997); Agreement of Cooperation in Mutual Assistance in the Field of Combating the Production of and Traffic in Narcotics and Psychotropic Substances, the Improper use of Drugs and Related Matters (1998); Agreement on the Promotion and Reciprocal Protection of Investments (1998); Air Service Agreement (1999); Agreement for Scientific and Technological Cooperation (2006); Extradition Treaty (2007); Treaty on Mutual Legal Assistance in Criminal Matters (2007); Agreement on Cooperation in the Peaceful Uses of Nuclear Energy (2008); Memorandum of Understanding in Defense Cooperation (2010); Agreement of Cooperation in the Fields of Arts and Culture (2011); Agreement for the Exchange of Information relating to Tax Matters (2013); Agreement of Mutual Assistance between both nations Customs Administrations (2013) and an Agreement of Cooperation in the Field of Agriculture (2013).

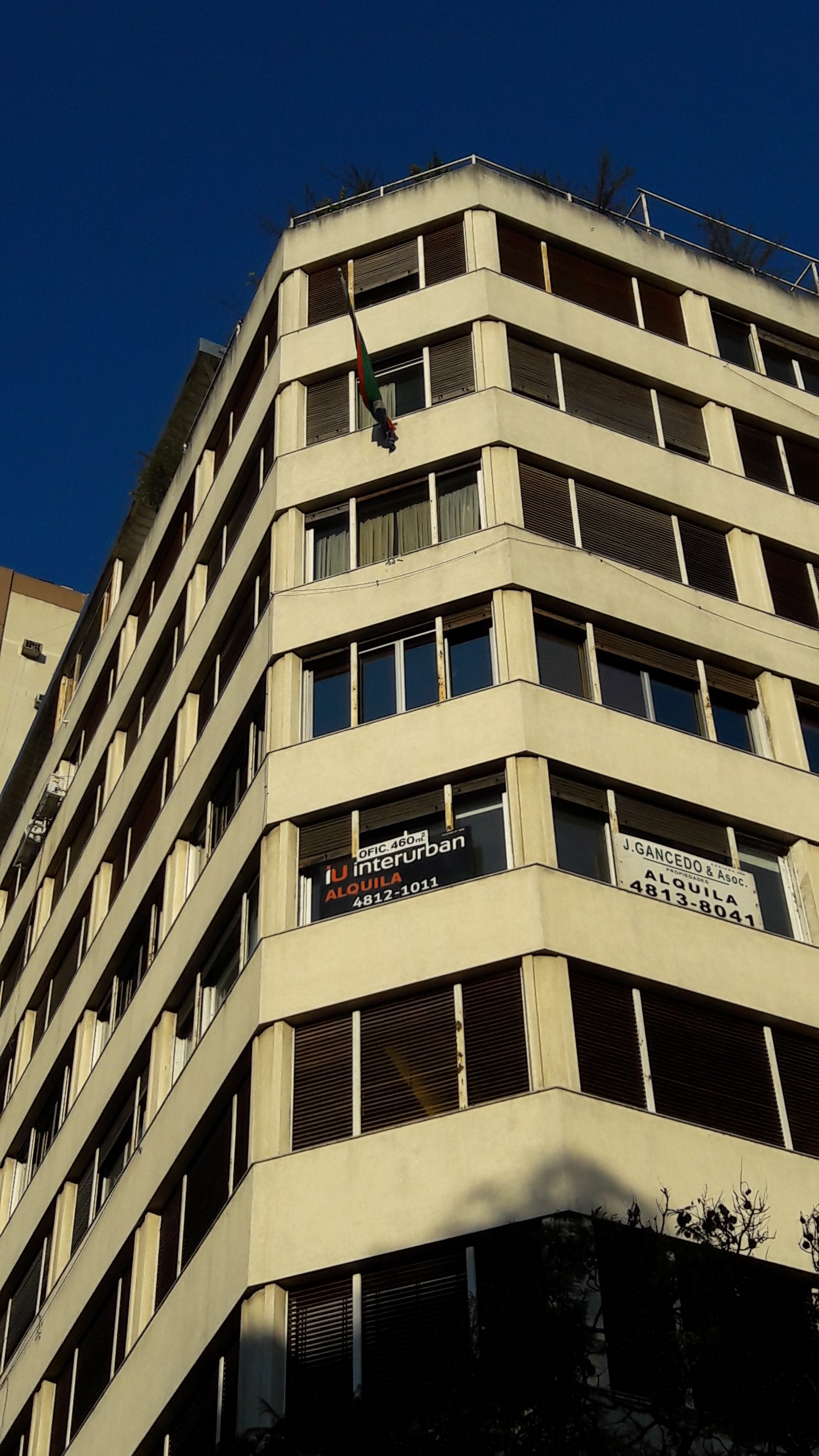
Embassy of South Africa in Buenos Aires

== Resident diplomatic missions ==
- Argentina has an embassy in Pretoria.
- South Africa has an embassy in Buenos Aires.

== See also ==
- South African Argentines
