= Permanent Representative of South Africa to the United Nations =

Coordinates: 40.756731°N 73.969773°W

- Incumbent; Mxolisi Sizo Nkosi since May 6, 2026
- Inaugural holder: Philip Rudolph Botha
- Formation: April 25, 1945
- Website: http://www.southafrica-usa.net/pmun/ambassador.html

The South African Permanent Representative in New York City is the official representative of the Government in Pretoria next the Headquarters of the United Nations.

== History ==
- In 1945 South Africa was one of the 51 founding member of the United Nations.
- On 12 November 1974 the United Nations General Assembly suspended South Africa from participating in its work, due to international opposition to the policy of apartheid.
- In 1994 following its transition into a democracy South Africa was re-admitted to the UN.
- Since 1994 the democratically elected government has pursued a foreign policy based on the centrality of the UN in the multilateral system.

== List of representatives ==
| Diplomatic accreditation | Permanent Representative | Observations | President of South Africa | Secretary-General of the United Nations | Term end |
|---|---|---|---|---|---|
| April 25, 1945 | Philip Rudolph Botha | Trade Commissioner, New York, September 29, 1929: Commercial Secretary, New York, March 1, 1946: Envoy Extraordinary, Lisbon, October 10, 1949: Envoy Extraordinary, Brussels, August 23, 1951: Ambassador, Brussels | J. B. M. Hertzog | Gladwyn Jebb | |
| July 18, 1947 | Seymour Jacklin | | Jan Smuts | Trygve Halvdan Lie | |
| November 1, 1948 | Eric Louw | Eric Louw, representative of the South African government at the United Nations in November 1948, | Daniel François Malan | Trygve Halvdan Lie | |
| September 16, 1949 | Gerhardus Petrus Jooste | 1937 Charge d Affairs in Brussels.; 1941: Charge d Affairs Belgian government in London; 31 March 1949: South African Ambassador to the United States.; April 30, 1954: High Commissioner, London | Daniel François Malan | Trygve Halvdan Lie | December 31, 1949 |
| January 1, 1949 | Jan Ruiter Jordaan | Deputy permanent representative to the United Nations | Daniel François Malan | Trygve Halvdan Lie | May 18, 1949 |
| June 20, 1954 | Wentzel Christoffel du Plessis | October 28, 1953: High Commissioner, Ottawa; August 1, 1956: South African Ambassador to the United States | Daniel François Malan | Dag Hammarskjöld | June 19, 1954 |
| September 19, 1955 | Donald Bell Sole | Deputy permanent representative to the United Nations | Johannes Gerhardus Strijdom | Dag Hammarskjöld | May 18, 1949 |
| August 1, 1956 | Donald Bell Sole | | Johannes Gerhardus Strijdom | Dag Hammarskjöld | July 31, 1956 |
| April 1, 1957 | Johan Samuel Frederick Botha | acting Permanent representative (* February 18, 1919, South Africa): married 1949, Teresa M Robbins, one daughter, three sons.; education : University of Stellenbosch, University of South Africa.; 1940-1945 served with South African Army.; 1949-1954: second secretary, South African Embassy Washington DC.; 1954-1957: second secretary South Afarican Embassy Ottawa.; 1954-1957: permanent representative to UN.; 1959-1962: assistant secretary, Department of Foreign Affairs, Pretoria.; 1964-1967: minister, South African Embassy, Washington DC.; 1967-1971: deputy secretary for Foreign Affairs.; 1971 appointed South African Ambassador to the United States | Johannes Gerhardus Strijdom | Dag Hammarskjöld | March 30, 1957 |
| September 1, 1958 | Bernardus Gerhardus Fourie | March 26, 1982: South African Ambassador to the United States | Hendrik Verwoerd | Dag Hammarskjöld | August 31, 1958 |
| May 1, 1962 | Matthys Izak Botha | February 26, 1959: Envoy Extraordinary, Berne.; July 21, 1970: Ambassador in Ottawa.; January 1, 1974: Ambassador of Rome.; February 1, 1977: Ambassador London.; March 5, 1979: Ambassador Bhisho. | Charles Robberts Swart | U Thant | July 10, 1962 |
| October 14, 1970 | Carl Friedrich George von Hirschberg | May 1, 1975: Consul General in Tokyo | Jacob Johannes Fouché | U Thant | July 16, 1970 |
| February 15, 1974 | Pik Botha | 35/5000 March 10, 1975: South African Ambassador to the United States | Jacob Johannes Fouché | Kurt Waldheim | |
| January 1, 1976 | Jacobus Adriaan Eksteen | Till 1977 a Charge d Affairs. (*was born 31 October 1942 in Volksrust, Transvaal, Republic (then Union) of South Africa.: He received the M.A. in political science, cum laude, from the University of South Africa.; He entered the Civil Service in 1961, beginning with the Department of Interior, and was transferred to the Department of Justice in December of that year. | Johannes de Klerk | Kurt Waldheim | |
| November 5, 1981 | David Whitefoord Steward | (* 23. Mai 1945 in Nairobi): Son of Alexander Harvey Whitefoord Steward.; educated St. John's School Leatherhead, UK; 1976-1978: Counsellor SA Embassy Ottawa. | Marais Viljoen | Kurt Waldheim | January 1, 1979 |
| October 7, 1983 | Kurt Robert Samuel von Schirnding | | Marais Viljoen | Javier Pérez de Cuéllar | January 1, 1982 |
| January 1, 1987 | Albert Leslie Manley | 07|1988: Permanent Representative, Geneva (UN), | Pieter Willem Botha | Javier Pérez de Cuéllar | |
| September 11, 1991 | Vernon Rudston Whiteford Steward | Ambassador V R W Steward aa) United Nations of America (New York) [UN] bb)from 01.08.91 to 01.08.95 | Frederik Willem de Klerk | Javier Pérez de Cuéllar | |
| February 1995 | Josiah Khiphusizi Jele | (* 1 May 1930, in Alexandra, Johannesburg). | Nelson Mandela | Boutros Boutros-Ghali | |
| April 21, 1999 | Dumisani Kumalo | | Thabo Mbeki | Kofi Annan | January 1, 1998 |
| March 17, 2009 | Baso Sangqu | | Jacob Zuma | Ban Ki-moon | March 16, 2009 |
| March 13, 2013 | Jeremiah Kingsley Mamabolo | (*Born in Johannesburg on 13 August 1955): 2009: High Commissioner to Nigeria | Jacob Zuma | Ban Ki-moon | 2018 |
| July 5, 2016 | Jerry Matthews Matjila | | Jacob Zuma | Ban Ki-moon | 2018 |
| February 3, 2021 | Mathu Theda Joyini | | Cyril Ramaphosa | António Guterres | 2026 |
| May 6, 2026 | Mxolisi Sizo Nkosi | Former Ambassador and Permanent Representative of South Africa to the United Nations in Geneva and Other International Organisations in Switzerland. | Cyril Ramaphosa | António Guterres | |
