= Carel de Wet =

South African physician, politician

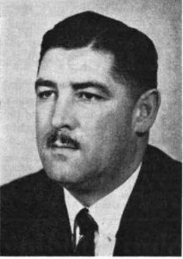

South African Ambassador to the United Kingdom

Personal details
- Born: Carl Pieter Cronje de Wet; 25 May 1924 Memel, Orange Free State, Union of South Africa
- Died: 22 May 2004 (aged 79)
- Party: National Party
- Spouse: Rina Maas (m. 1949)
- Children: 4
- Relatives: Christian de Wet (Grandfather)
- Education: University of Witwatersrand

Carel Pieter Cronje de Wet (25 May 1924 – 22 May 2004) was a South African politician, medical doctor, diplomat, and member of the National Party. De Wet was mayor for Vanderbijlpark and MP of that town, then MP for Johannesburg West, and was also an Ambassador.

== Life ==
Dr. Carel de Wet was born in Memel, Orange Free State Province (Now Free State). He was the grandson of Boer general Christiaan Rudolf de Wet, born 2 years after his death. He married Rina Maas in 1949 and they both had 4 children together. De Wet matriculated from Vrede High School. He would attend the University of Pretoria and graduated with a Bachelor of Science. He then attended Wits University and was a Medical School graduate.

== Political career ==
De Wet was elected mayor of Vanderbijlpark in 1950 and became MP for that town from 1953 until 1964, in that same year, he succeeded Hilgard Muller as South African Ambassador in London, at 39, he was the youngest South African ambassador, later he would become MP for West Johannesburg in 1967. He was minister of Planning, Health, and Mines, until, on 12 May 1970, Prime Minister John Vorster, transferred his planning portfolio, though he still remained minister of Health and Mines. In 1972, he was reappointed South African Ambassador in London, a position he held until 1977.
