= Charles Theodore Te Water =

South African diplomat

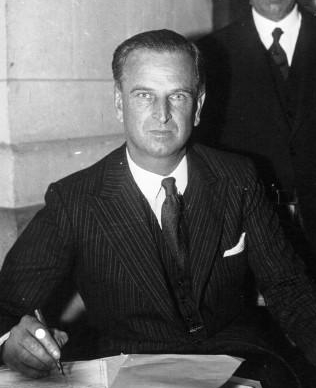
- Te Water in 1933

President of the Assembly of the League of Nations
- In office 1933–1934
- Preceded by: Paul Hymans
- Succeeded by: Rickard Sandler

Personal details
- Born: 4 February 1887 Graaff-Reinet, Cape Colony
- Died: 6 June 1964 (aged 77) Cape Town, Cape Province South Africa

Charles Theodore Te Water (4 February 1887 – 6 June 1964) was a South African barrister, diplomat and politician who was appointed as President of the Assembly of the League of Nations. Te Water also served as the South African high commissioner to the United Kingdom between 1929 and 1939, where he was an influential voice for the appeasement of Germany. He was known for his pushing of white supremacist and Apartheid policies during his political career.

== Diplomat in London and Geneva ==
Born in Graaff-Reinet, Cape Colony, on 4 February 1887, the son of Dr Thomas Te Water, a medical doctor and politician, Charles Te Water was educated at Bedford School and at Christ's College, Cambridge. Like all Afrikaners, te Water was of Dutch, German and French descent.

He became a barrister of the Inner Temple in 1910, and was a member of the Pretoria bar between 1910 and 1929. He represented Pretoria for the National Party in the Union Parliament between 1924 and 1929, and was High Commissioner for the Union of South Africa in London between 1929 and 1939. He was the Union of South Africa's delegate to the League of Nations between 1929 and 1939, and was appointed as President of the Assembly of the League of Nations between 1933 and 1934.

Te Water was an Afrikaner nationalist who saw the League of Nations as a useful way to make the case for greater South African autonomy within the British Empire. South Africa had been granted Dominion status in 1910 as the Union of South Africa, but the British government still had certain powers such as the right to declare war on behalf of the entire British Empire, which had been most dramatically illustrated in 1914 when South Africa together with all of the Dominions was committed to war when Britain declared war on Imperial Germany. Not until 1931 with the Statute of Westminster were the Dominions formally given the power to declare war on their own. As a diplomat, te Water consistently stressed his belief that the Dominions were only bound to Britain on a voluntary basis, being held together by ties of history and sentiment, and fiercely resented any claim by the British government to speak on behalf of South Africa.

Beyond making the case for greater South African autonomy, te Water was keenly interested in the League because of South West Africa (modern Namibia), which South Africa administered as a mandate for the League of Nations. Through South Africa actually ruled South West Africa, technically the territory belonged to the League of Nations, which in theory could take it away from South Africa. South Africa's aim was always to annex South West Africa to become the fifth province of South Africa, but to do so required the consent of the German settlers in Southwest Africa as the League's mandate stated that to change the status of Southwest Africa required the consent of its "civilized" (i.e. white) people. The German settlers in Southwest Africa believed in the dolchstoßlegend and as such contending that Germany actually won World War One-being defeated by the alleged "stab-in-the-back"-felt it was only a matter of time before South West Africa was returned to Germany. The German settlers wanted South West Africa to remain a League mandate in order to await for the day that they believed that the League would order South West Africa returned to Germany, which in effect blocked South African plans to annex South West Africa. South Africa tried hard to be an ideal member of the League at least in part to improve its chances of annexing South West Africa. Te Water was very active on the League's Mandates Commission, which had the responsibility of monitoring how the mandatory powers were administrating the mandates. In a speech at the Mandates Commission, te Water criticized the entire concept of the mandates, which were supposed to be prepared for independence one day, saying he did not think that Southwest Africa could ever be independent as its white population was too small. Te Water advocated that it would be better if the League would allow South Africa to annex South West Africa as its fifth province to go along with the current four provinces of the Transvaal, the Orange Free State, Natal and the Cape province.

Besides for the wish to annex South West Africa, te Water was interested in having South Africa annex the three British protectorates in southern Africa, namely Bechuanaland (modern Botswana), Basutoland (modern Lesotho) and the Swaziland Protectorate (modern Eswatini). All three protectorates were created in the 19th century when African kings signed agreements to turn their kingdoms as into British protectorates as preferable to being annexed to the Boer republics, and South African leaders persistently regarded the three protectorates as rightfully part of South Africa. Te Water constantly raised complaints in London, charging that the three protectorates were under a lax British administration that made them centers of crime and disease, and claimed that it would better if South Africa were to annex the three protectorates. The British were politely rebuffed the demand for South Africa to annex the protectorates, stating Britain had signed agreements with the African monarchs in the 19th century and could not allow change the status of the protectorates without the consent of the African kings under British protection. Though the idea of the League of Nations was the brainchild of the U.S. President Woodrow Wilson, the actual design of the League was the work of Lord Cecil and Jan Smuts who devised the structure of the League at the Paris peace conference in 1919. As one of the "fathers" of the League was a South African, the South African media consistently held a keen interested in the League.

One of te Water's first acts as High Commissioner in London was to host a grand ball where the guests of honour were King George V and Queen Mary, who both gave speeches saying that they were glad that the wounds caused by the Boer War had healed and praised South Africa as a successful Dominion in Africa. Te Water's predecessor as High Commissioner, Eric Louw, was a republican Afrikaner nationalist whose relations with the British were stormy to say the least, accounting for his very short term as High Commissioner, and the British welcomed te Water in 1929 as a great improvement over Louw. Even te Water's accent was considered an improvement as unlike Louw who spoken English with a strong Afrikaans accent, te Water's English was spoken with a mixture of an Afrikaans accent tinged with an upper class English accent he had acquired during his time at Cambridge. Te Water represented South Africa at the World Disarmament Conference in Geneva in 1932–34, where his most notable speech was in 1932 calling for South Africa to have a stronger air force "in view of the long distances and semi-barbarous people which his government had to control". On 22 June 1933, he formally opened the South Africa House as the new home of the high commission where the guests of honour were again the King and the Queen. Much to te Water's private displeasure, one of the guests who gave a speech at the opening of the South Africa House was the poet Rudyard Kipling whose jingoistic statements during the Boer War had made him unpopular with the Afrikaners, but as Kipling praised modern South Africa in his speech, including him in the ceremony was felt to be a sign of reconciliation. As a diplomat, he successfully lobbied Lord Reith to have the BBC give more favorable coverage to South Africa, charging that the BBC mostly ignored South Africa and even when it did mention South Africa too often played into the Boer stereotype.

Te Water cut an impressive figure in London, with one person remembering him as: "He was of striking appearance, tall, good-looking, and always immaculately groomed; his suits were tailored, I think, in Conduit Street, shirts and shoes bespoke; he favored a narrow-brimmed Homburg, short black coat, striped trousers, suede gloves and a stick". By all accounts a man of much charisma and charm, te Water was widely admired by his staff at the South Africa House and was regarded by British decision-makers as the most able and intelligent of all the Dominion High Commissioners in London. The Afrikaners had once called themselves the Boers ("farmers") because that was what they were, but as the 20th century progressed, many had moved to urban areas and entered the middle classes, leading to the new name Afrikaner being adopted. The popular Boer stereotype was and (still is) that of a gun-toting ferocious farmer living out on the veld, fierce in the defense of his family and his farm, and profoundly ignorant of everything beyond farming, horses, guns and the dogma of the Dutch Reformed Church. The suave, elegant diplomat te Water was seen in both Britain and South Africa as the image of the modern Afrikaner who had moved beyond the Boer stereotype. At the same time, the fact that te Water was an active sportsman with an athletic build and had what the British press called a very "masculine appearance" led him to conform enough to the Boer stereotype of a tough and hardy people that there were no fears of him having "gone soft".

An aloof, arrogant man, te Water hated what he called "socialising", regarding the balls and parties he was expected to attend as boring, but was willing to do so in order to make social connections with the British elite. Fluent in both English and French, te Water was regarded as "an orator of remarkable power" and his speeches before the League's General Assembly in Geneva were always well received. One contemporary report from 1932 about the possibility of applying sanctions on Japan for seizing Manchuria from China stated: "The most forceful of the three Dominion speakers and one of the most dynamic within the whole Assembly was te Water". Sir John Simon, the British Foreign Secretary between 1931 and 1935 who sometimes spoke before the League General Assembly (through Simon hated Geneva and tried to avoid the city as much as possible), was widely believed to resent the way that te Water's speeches outshone his speeches. One speech te Water gave before the League Assembly in early 1932, suggesting that the League should impose sanctions on Japan for bombing Shanghai, led to Simon's ire who complained that the Japanese embassy in London assumed that te Water was speaking for Britain, and that he was forced to deal with the resulting Japanese protests.

On 19 April 1932, te Water met with Sir Thomas Wilford, the New Zealand high commissioner in London and Henry Stimson, the American Secretary of State, who was attending the World Disarmament Conference in Geneva. According to Stimson's account of the meeting, both Wilford and te Water were upset at the passivity of the British government with regard to the Japanese aggression against China, saying Britain should be doing far more to upheld the League's authority. Stimson himself favored a tougher line against Japan, but was overruled by President Herbert Hoover. However, Stimson was gratified when both Wilford and te Water spoke of their wish to see greater Anglo-American co-operation in Asia, saying this was the best way to restrain Japan. Te Water gave a strong speech before the League General Assembly, saying that the Chinese complaint about Japanese aggression had much merit, and the League should be doing much more than merely sending the Lytton commission out to investigate whatever Japan committed aggression or not, saying that if was the best the League could do, then the peace of the world was doomed. Reflecting his moderate Afrikaner nationalism, the diplomat whom te Water was closest to in London was the Irish High Commissioner John Dulanty, who like him had to balance his nationalism with membership in the Commonwealth. Te Water, who was distantly related to the executed Irish nationalist Robert Emmet, was sympathetic towards Dulanty's efforts to quietly move the Irish Free State away from the British sphere of influence.

In March 1933 as president of the General Assembly of the League of Nations, te Water oversaw the stormy session where the Lytton Report was presented, which concluded that Japan had committed aggression against China in 1931 by seizing Manchuria and that Manchukuo was a sham. In his speech before the Assembly, te Water condemned Japan for its actions and urged sanctions be imposed. The session ended with the Japanese delegate Yōsuke Matsuoka announcing that Japan was leaving the League effective immediately.

== Appeasement: For and Against ==
Because South Africa had South West Africa as a League of Nations mandate, te Water did not want to see the League weakened, which in turn would weaken South Africa's claim to South West Africa. Through te Water believed that the Treaty of Versailles was too harsh towards Germany, he was opposed to the German demand to have South West Africa returned to the Reich, supporting the Treaty of Versailles as long as it allowed South Africa to gain territory. In the spring and summer of 1935, Fascist Italy had moved a massive number of troops into the Italian colonies of Eritrea and Italian Somaliland, and it was soon clear that Italy would be invading Ethiopia in the very near future. As Ethiopia was a member of the League of Nations, the impeding war was widely seen as a "test case" of the League's authority. During the Abyssinia crisis of 1935–1936, te Water had been initially opposed to League of Nations sanctions against Italy for invading Ethiopia, but once the sanctions were applied, he was a strong advocate of maintaining them, believing that the crisis was a "test case" of the League. As such, te Water, despite his hatred of "socialising", he cultivated Anthony Eden, the British minister responsible for the League of Nations affairs and known as the strongest voice within the cabinet for sanctions against Italy. Te warned Eden that if the League failed to stop Italy, it would being the end of the League's moral authority. Te Water was not particularly concerned about Ethiopia, instead being more concerned that if the League's moral authority collapsed, then Germany would have a stronger case for taking back South West Africa as Adolf Hitler demanded in various speeches that all of the former German colonies in Africa "go home to the Reich".

In his reports to Pretoria from Geneva, te Water was largely indifferent to Ethiopia as he mostly stressed that Germany would have a much stronger case for the return of South West Africa if the League's moral authority were lost. The issue was especially pressing as the German community in Southwest Africa had become thoroughly Nazified by the 1930s and was very vocal in demanding that Southwest Africa "go home to the Reich", holding parades and protest meetings under the banner of the swastika. In common with other South African leaders such as the prime minister J. B. M. Hertzog and the deputy prime minister, Jan Smuts, te Water supported the idea of Germany taking back its former African colonies held by Britain, France and Belgium, and was only opposed to South Africa returning Southwest Africa to the Reich. The German demand for the return of Southwest Africa was especially embarrassing to Hertzog and Smuts, who had long been very vocal in expressing their viewpoint that the Treaty of Versailles was too harsh towards Germany, and found themselves with regard to Southwest Africa in the highly uncomfortable position of having to defend the Treaty of Versailles. Both Herzog and Smuts made it clear to te Water that they wanted to find a way to persuade Hitler to drop his demand for Southwest Africa, which they regarded as a future "fifth province" of South Africa.

In a speech before the League General Assembly on 13 September 1935, te Water stated he regarded any effort to change the frontiers of Africa outside of the League of Nations as "a danger to the adventuring nations themselves, danger to the black peoples of Africa, and a menace to our white civilization, which now after centuries of trial and sacrifice so firmly and we believe beneficently established in southern Africa." Te Water went on to state if European nations such as Italy and Germany continued on their present course, trying to change the frontiers of Africa "outside of the covering blanket of the League", it would be the ruin of Africa as he claimed that black Africa would "in its due and patient time, rise and overthrow, as it had done before in its long and dark history, and revert to that black barbarism which it has been our difficult destiny in the south to penetrate and enlighten". Just before the Italian invasion started, te Water in a speech appealed to Benito Mussolini "to pause and consider, even at this eleventh hour".

When the League Assembly voted for sanctions against Italy in October 1935, te Water joined the League's Co-ordinating Committee for the sanctions. In a speech before the League Assembly, te Water stated that South Africa "would face deep" racial problems because of Italy's invasion, saying "the black Africans would revert to that black barbarism, which threatened to destroy the peace that has been brought to the tribes of Africa". In the winter of 1935–36, te Water was opposed to the efforts of other League members to weaken the sanctions that had been applied against Italy, writing with much contempt about how economic self-interest trumped the self-proclaimed vaulted moral principles that the Italian aggression against Ethiopia was unacceptable. Te Water was one of the delegates to the League who supported oil sanctions against Italy, which would have shut down Italy's economy had oil sanctions been applied, but the possibility of a French veto on the League Council ensured that oil was never added to the League's sanctions list At the time, te Water told Eden of his fears that the United Kingdom "is at its old game of temporising and subordinating morals to the exigences of the situation". Te Water in a speech before the League Assembly stated: "...we know that the Covenant [of the League] is falling to pieces in our hands. Fifty nations, led by three of the most powerful in the world, are about to declare their powerlessness to protect the weakest in their midst from destruction. The authority of the League of Nations is about to come to nought".

In contrast to Italy, Water favored a different line with Germany. During the crisis caused by the remilitarization of the Rhineland on 7 March 1936, te Water stated that there was no possibility of South Africa going to war to keep the Rhineland demilitarised, saying that it was regrettable that Germany had just violated the Treaty of Versailles and the Locarno treaty in this manner, but the issue was not worth a war. The American historian Gerhard Weinberg wrote that it was clear "by 13 March that the British Dominions, especially the Union of South Africa and Canada, would not stand with England if war came. The South African government in particular was busy backing the German position in London and with the other Dominion governments". However, despite his support for Ethiopia in public, te Water reflecting South African fears of black men being armed told Dominions Secretary Malcolm MacDonald in May 1936: "Recognising that Abyssinia [Ethiopia] was a really barbarous country, which ought never to have been admitted to membership of the League, we should agree to Italy having a mandate over the whole country, on the condition that she obey mandatory principles. The most important of these in Mr. te Water's eyes, is of course the non-arming of the natives". When it was announced that the League was ending the sanctions imposed on Italy in July 1936 despite the fact that Italy just conquered Ethiopia, te Water was opposed, warning in a speech: "The memory of Black Africa never forgets and never forgives an injury or an injustice". Te Water's outspoken criticism of the League's failure in Ethiopia led one Foreign Office official to comment: "He is often ruder than he knows".

During his time in London, Te Water was close to the other Dominion high commissioners to co-ordinate diplomacy. Starting in May 1936, te Water attended weekly meetings at the house of the Canadian high commissioner Vincent Massey to discuss matters of common concern for the Dominions, and as such te Water became close to Massey together with the Australian High Commissioner Stanley Bruce. One result of these meetings was a tendency for the Dominion High Commissioners in London was to work together closely to achieve common goals such as pressuring Britain to pursue a policy of appeasement towards Germany. Te Water and Bruce were deeply concerned about the German demand for the return of the lost German colonies as Australia administered the former colony of German New Guinea, and both Bruce and te Water advocated appeasement in Europe as a way to encourage Hitler to drop his demand for Southwest Africa and New Guinea. In September 1936, te Water met the mildly Anglophobic Canadian Prime Minister William Lyon Mackenzie King when the latter visited London, and the two bonded over a shared dislike of the Dominions Office. King told te Water that the Dominion Office was "just a glorified Colonial Office" whose officials did not treat him with respect, an assessment that te Water shared. The main division in Canadian politics at the time was the line between continentalism (i.e. moving Canada closer to the United States) and imperialism (which in a Canadian context meant closer ties to Britain). King belonged to the continentalism school, and spoke highly to te Water about the benefits of closer ties to the United States as a way of weakening British influence. In September 1937, te Water visited Ottawa as the guest of Mackenzie King where the two men agreed to establish diplomatic relations between Canada and South Africa. During the same visit to Ottawa, te Water in a press conference called for an international conference to discuss the German demand for the return of the former African colonies. Te Water privately hoped that at such an international conference that it would be possible to "compensate" Germany with the Belgian Congo and the Portuguese African colonies in exchange for Germany giving up its demand for Southwest Africa.

All of the Dominion high commissioners shared certain common beliefs about the problems of Europe and how best to resolve them. The Dominion high commissioners as a group all accepted the claim that the Treaty of Versailles was far too harsh towards Germany and believed that the treaty was in need of drastic revision in favor of the Reich. Accordingly, the Dominion high commissioners saw France with its efforts to maintain the Versailles system as the main trouble-maker in Europe and felt that the Britain should be more aggressive and forceful in trying to make the French "see reason". Alongside the belief that France rather than Germany was the principal trouble-maker was a very strongly held conviction that another war with Germany would be a disaster for the West that would only benefit the Soviet Union, the nation that the Dominion high commissioners all saw as utterly evil and feared the most. Te Water believed that another Anglo-German war would so weaken whatever power emerged victorious that the Soviet Union would easily eliminate the victor. As a group, the Dominion high commissioners consistently pressed for appeasement, making it clear that there was no possibility of their nations joining Britain in another war against the Reich unless it was clear that the Commonwealth itself was in danger. Te Water supported the Chamberlain government's "limited liability" rearmament policy, where the bulk of the defense budget went to the Royal Air Force and the Royal Navy while the British Army was starved of funds. The purpose of the "limited liability" policy was to rule out the "continental commitment" (i.e. send an expeditionary force to France on the same scale as World War I), which te Water felt was a contribution towards peace as he believed that the lack of the "continental commitment" (which the French wanted very badly) would make France more dependent on Britain. Te Water disliked France largely because the French Army recruited very heavily in Africa for soldiers. Germany's greater population led the Wehrmacht to outnumber the French military by a factor of three to one, leading the French to embrace la force noire as a way to equal the odds. For te Water, the idea of black men fighting as soldiers was an abomination, which led him to condemn France as a threat to "white civilisation in Africa".

In contrast to his support for appeasement of Germany, te Water was opposed to any appeasement of Japan, favouring having Commonwealth nations take a tougher line with the Japanese. In part this was due to the influence of Bruce, who in common with almost all Australians at the time feared Japanese ambitions in the Pacific, and in part due to the fact that Japan was an Asian power whose ambitions were seen by te Water as a threat to white supremacy. Despite his fear of the Soviet Union, the possibility of a Soviet-Japanese war was highly welcome to him, believing that this would distract the two powers from posing any threat to the British Empire. For the same reasons, te Water welcomed the Sino-Japanese war, hoping that China and Japan might fight to a stalemate which would weaken the two Asian giants so much as to end any possibility of further challenges to the dominant position of the British Empire in Asia. Likewise, te Water favored a tougher line with Italy, whose ambitions to dominate the Mediterranean he considered a threat to the British empire, but for him, the Italian threat only added another reason for the appeasement of Germany. Te Water believed that Benito Mussolini was banking on an Anglo-German conflict to achieve his Mediterranean ambitions, and that an Anglo-German "general settlement" would end the developing Italo-German alliance, and hence the Italian threat. An additional worry for te Water about Italian ambitions was the Mediterranean was the prospect of the Mediterranean being closed to British shipping, which would increase the importance of the sea lane around the Cape of Good Hope, which in turn would hamper South Africa's drive for more autonomy. Despite his support for League sanctions against Italy in 1935–36, te Water supported the Anglo-Italian Easter Accords of 1938, under which Britain recognised King Victor Emmanuel III's claim to be the Emperor of Ethiopia, which in effect meant recognising the Italian annexation of Ethiopia in 1936. By 1938, te Water felt Ethiopia was a lost cause and while Britain should block further Italian expansionism in Africa, the cause of Ethiopia should be written off.

The government of Prime Minister Neville Chamberlain greatly valued the opinions of the Dominion high commissioners and unusually for the secretive Chamberlain government, the Dominion high commissioners were kept well informed by the Colonial and Dominions Secretary Malcolm MacDonald about where Whitehall stood on the issues facing Britain. The efforts of the Chamberlain government to keep the high commissioners "in the loop" was due to the knowledge that the victory of 1918 would have been impossible without the Dominions and it was accepted by all of the decision-makers in Whitehall that Dominion support was essential if another world war should break out. The Chanak crisis of 1922 when Canada refused to join Britain when it was on the brink of war with Turkey revealed that Dominion support for the "mother country" could not be automatically taken for granted as it had been assumed in London until then. As such, the views of the Dominion high commissioners in London were highly influential with the Chamberlain government during the Sudetenland crisis of 1938 and the Danzig crisis of 1939.

== The Sudetenland crisis ==
Britain had no obligation to defend Czechoslovakia, but under the terms of the Franco-Czechoslovak alliance of 1924, France was obligated to go to war if Germany attacked Czechoslovakia.

However, it was believed in London that in any Franco-German war would result in a German victory, which would upset the balance of power in Europe too much, thus forcing Britain to intervene to save France. With Germany threatening Czechoslovakia, and with the French government resisting pressure from Britain to renounce the alliance with Czechoslovakia, the British government felt it had no choice, but to become involved in the Sudetenland crisis by pressuring Czechoslovakia to give in to the German demands. The way in which the French refusal to renounce the alliance with Czechoslovakia had caused Britain to become involved was very much resented by te Water and the other Dominion high commissioners who saw the French premier Édouard Daladier as the trouble-maker who was causing the Czechoslovak president Edvard Beneš to act as they saw it in an irresponsible and reckless manner by resisting the German demands regarding the Sudetenland. On 22 March 1938, the South African Prime Minister J. B. M. Hertzog instructed te Water to tell the British Foreign Secretary Lord Halifax that South Africa had no interest in the affairs of Eastern Europe and under no conditions would go to war in defense of Czechoslovakia. Hertzog added that he hoped that Britain would not also go to war for the sake of Czechoslovakia, but that if the United Kingdom did, South Africa would declare neutrality. On 25 May 1938, Lord Halifax told a meeting of the high commissioners that his government's preferred solution to turn Czechoslovakia from a unitary state into a federation, which he believed would balance out Czechoslovakia with its mixture of Czechs, Slovaks, volksdeutsch (ethnic Germans), Poles, Hungarians and Ukrainians. Te Water together with Bruce objected to Halifax's plan, saying it would be better just to cede the Sudetenland to Germany. Undeterred, Halifax took Massey aside after the meeting to ask him how English-Canadians and French-Canadians got along in Canada-which he saw as a model for the Czechs and Sudeten Germans-as he maintained that Canadian style federalism was the best solution he envisioned for Czechoslovakia. In July 1938, te Water reported to Hertzog approvingly that Lord Halifax had during his most recent trip to Paris had applied very strong pressure on France to in turn apply pressure on Czechoslovakia to settle the Sudetenland crisis in favor of Germany. Te Water also reported that Lord Halifax had been given a promise that France would not make no military move without consulting with Britain first, which te Water saw as a hopeful sign for peace.

In early September 1938, the Sudetenland crisis escalated dramatically with Beneš making the dramatic offer of a "Fourth Plan" for a new constitution for Czechoslovakia that was rejected by the Sudeten German leader Konrad Heinlen who instead launched a failed revolt in the Sudetenland. With the Czechoslovak Army fighting the Sudeten Freikorps, the German media started a hysterical campaign against Czechoslovakia. On 12 September 1938, Hitler in his speech at the Nuremberg Party Rally for the first time laid claim to the Sudetenland (before then, he had merely demanded autonomy for the Sudetenland)– a new demand that made a peaceful resolution of the crisis far more difficult. Reflecting the level of tension, starting on 12 September 1938 MacDonald started daily meetings with the Dominion high commissioners to keep them informed about what was happening. Throughout the 1938 crisis, te Water cast the matter entirely as a matter of national self-determination, arguing that since the majority of the Sudeten Germans wanted to "go home to the Reich", it was entirely right that they should. On 14 September 1938, te Water met with Massey where both men agreed that as to the prospect going to war to save Czechoslovakia, this "astonishing episode" was utterly absurd. Te Water reported to Pretoria that both he and Massey felt that self-determination for the Sudetenland was "acknowledged as a sound ethical basis for a fair and proper settlement of the dispute". Te Water further stated that if Germany should invade Czechoslovakia, in his opinion it would not be a case of aggression on the part of Hitler as he argued that the real "aggressors" would be were Daladier and Beneš, and Chamberlain as well if he failed to make Daladier and Beneš "see reason". Te Water expressed much frustration with the Dominion decision-making during the crisis, charging that Mackenzie King was too timid while the Australian prime minister Joseph Lyons was too indolent, leading him to write to Hertzog "The Powerful Party shows the way" while public opinion "like a flock of sheep follows blindly" and the Dominion governments found themselves following the British government whether they wanted to or not, leading to a loss of "our national discretion". Te Water personally favored neutrality for South Africa, but was afraid that there were enough pro-British elements in South Africa to force the government into any potential conflict with Germany. Te Water felt that was needed was something like the Imperial War Cabinet of 1917–1918 with the Dominion prime ministers making policy jointly with the British prime minister, charging that the current system under which MacDonald briefed him and the other commissioners gave the British government too much power in deciding policy. In his reports to Pretoria, te Water was especially hostile towards Ivan Maisky, the Soviet ambassador in London, whom he accused of trying to engineer an Anglo-German war to allow the Soviet Union to take over the world. Te Water was in close contact with Stefanus Gie, the South African minister-plenipotentiary in Berlin during the crisis. Influenced by Gie, te Water depicted Hitler as "volatile, oratorically violent, risk acceptant, fanatically determined and difficult to predict".

As part of an effort to prevent a peaceful resolution of the crisis, Hitler brought in Polish and Hungarian demands against Czechoslovakia, stating that if even the Sudetenland were allowed to join Germany that he might still attack Czechoslovakia if the Polish and Hungarian demands were rejected, an aspect of his diplomacy that stunned many at the time. Most of the Dominion high commissioners rejected this linkage, but te Water felt best "to administer the whole dose of caster oil" by having Czechoslovakia cede Teschen to Poland, and Slovakia and Ruthenia to Hungary. However, te Water also reported that he had seen evidence from the Foreign Office that Germany was encouraging both Poland and Hungary to make demands against Czechoslovakia, and obliquely admitted in a dispatch to Pretoria on 21 September 1938 that Hitler was only doing so as a "deal-breaker", not because he really cared about the Hungarian and Polish claims. On 19 September 1938, MacDonald told the high commissioners that Britain was considering "guaranteeing" Czechoslovakia in return for Beneš ceding the Sudetenland, an offer that alarmed te Water who preferred that Britain stay out of the quarrels of Eastern Europe altogether. Te Water at first told MacDonald that there was no possibility of South Africa joining in any "guarantee" of Czechoslovakia, saying in a telegram to Hertzog that Bruce had told him "he will be more cautious in the future". Later the same day, te Water again met MacDonald to tell him that South Africa just might join a "guarantee" of Czechoslovakia if was brought in under the rubric of the League of Nations and if Hitler could be induced to sign a non-aggression pact with Czechoslovakia. However, he admitted that such a "guarantee" was unlikely, which he understood would be against "unprovoked aggression and not of the new boundaries". He stated in a dispatch to Hertzog that Chamberlain was putting his hopes on a German-Czechoslovak non-aggression pact rather on an international "guarantee" of Czechoslovakia. In the same dispatch, he stated that the Chamberlain government had "rather a queer mind, as always thoroughly illogical, but in a more volatile state than I have ever known it". Te Water stated he could not understand Chamberlain's policy with its willingness to accept the German demands on Czechoslovakia, but at the same time rejected the Polish and Hungarian demands, and was willing to consider a "guarantee" of a nation that te Water considered to be highly unstable. Despite his doubts, te Water argued in a telegram to Hertzog stated that "the incalculable Hitler might yet astonish everyone by playing his part".

Following the rejection of Hitler's ultimatum issued during the Anglo-German summit at Bad Godesburg on 23 September 1938 the world was on the brink of another world war. The days from 22 to 28 September 1938 were a time of high tension with te Water reporting to Hertzog that London was a city preparing for war with children being sent out to the countryside to escape the expected bombing, people wearing gas masks on the streets in case of chemical bombs being dropped and buildings being boarded up. Te Water reported to Hertzog that Chamberlain "must find a way out". Te Water admitted that Hitler's Bad Godesburg ultimatum was extreme, all the more so for the insulting language in which it was phrased, but added that he still regretted that the British and French governments had both rejected it. At a meeting of the Dominion high commissioners, a difference of opinion emerged with Bruce supporting the cession of the Sudetenland, but opposed to the Bad Godesburg ultimatum as too humiliating whereas Massey, te Water and Dulanty all supported accepting the Bad Godesburg ultimatum. In attempt to find a compromise, te Water put forward what he called "a liberal interpretation of principle", calling for Czechoslovakia to hand over the Sudetenland to an international force who in turn would hand it over to Germany. However, a motion put forward by Bruce calling for an "honorable settlement" that see the Sudetenland go to Germany in exchange for a promise from Hitler to allow the rest of Czechoslovakia to continue as an independent state was accepted by all of the Dominion high commissioners. On 26 September 1938, te Water had the South Africa House boarded up and reported to Hertzog: "Zero hour is very nearly reached, issue hanging on Hitler's acceptance or rejection".

On 26 September 1938, te Water told Chamberlain and Lord Halifax that if Britain should go to war for the defence of Czechoslovakia, it was "unthinkable" that South Africa would also join in. Te Water argued that Czechoslovakia was not worth fighting for, all the more so because Czechoslovakia had signed an alliance with the Soviet Union (which put Czechoslovakia beyond the pale in his opinion), and stated his belief that Britain should find a peaceful way of resolving the crisis. During the same meeting, te Water called the Franco-Czechoslovak alliance of 1924 "a menace to peace" and asked it was possible that Britain could just pressure France into renouncing it, which would turn any German-Czechoslovak war into just a local war instead of a world war. Te Water reported that: "Chamberlain found it difficult to understand the type of mind and methods of the Chancellor, while Hitler appeared to be at a loss to understand Mr. Chamberlain's astonishment at the tone of the Hitler ultimatum, which latter described as merely a memorandum". Te Water reported to Hertzog: "Bruce, Massey, Dulanty and I left nothing unsaid in explaining again the dangers to the Commonwealth system of Great Britain involving the Dominions in a war with which they were out of sympathy and on grounds which in their opinions did not constitute a direct threat to its security".

In a dispatch to Pretoria, te Water stated his displeasure with Chamberlain's guarded statements that Britain might go to war if Germany should invade Czechoslovakia, but he also argued that Chamberlain was far preferable to any of the alternatives such as the Labour Party; the Liberals; the "renegade Tories" such as Anthony Eden and "his paper", the Yorkshire Post plus Winston Churchill who was "fishing as always in troubled waters"; and finally the "disloyal" Foreign Office mandarins who were leading Chamberlain "up the garden path" by pushing for stronger British statements in favor of Czechoslovakia. Te Water complained in late September 1938 that Chamberlain had lost control of the situation where criticism of his policy was being heard in the press and from the Conservative backbenches in the House of Commons, where Churchill was starting to gather a following, which worried te Water. In particular, te Water was upset at the way that the primary issue, namely the status of the Sudetenland had been settled at the Anglo-German summit at Berchtesgaden where it was agreed that the Sudetenland would go to Germany, but the progress had been derailed by a secondary issue, namely the time-line for handing over the Sudetenland. After the Bad Godesburg summit, the issue was now only the question of the time-line for transferring the Sudetenland with the German government insisting that it had to be October 1, 1938 while the British and French governments wanted the transfer to happen after October 1. However, te Water blamed Chamberlain, not Hitler, for the failure of the Bad Godesburg summit. Te Water felt that Chamberlain had not been understanding enough of Hitler and charged that if he had been, "the document might have been reshaped and the tragic possibilities now threatening avoided". Had te Water been aware of the split in the British cabinet between Chamberlain and Lord Halifax who favored a tougher line with Germany he would have been more concerned.

In a private meeting with Chamberlain at 10 Downing Street on 27 September 1938, te Water complained: "It seemed intolerable that French commitments should be the cause of the British Commonwealth of Nations being drawn into war", and asked "why it is thought wrong to insist that the French should contribute to his peace efforts by another approach to their allies the Czechs". As an Afrikaner, te Water felt a certain sympathy with the Germans, another people who had "experienced the bitterness of defeat in war" as he reported about his meeting with Chamberlain:

"I was a little uncertain of his reading of Hitler's character and motives, which I felt could only be truly judged by a people and its leaders who had actually experienced the bitterness of defeat in war. We would not for instance read as readily deep-laid and sinister motives into Hitler's words and actions as he [Chamberlain] confessed he did. I implored him not to allow his suspicions in this regard to govern his judgement of the Hitler plan. I gave Hitler's constant reiteration of the phrase, "I am no coward". "History cannot judge me a coward" as the simple and safer key to his insistence on immediate occupation of the ceded territories by a certain date. That and his lack of faith in Allied undertakings and their actions in the past and in Benes's character".

Chamberlain's statement to te Water that he found Beneš "an unreliable and unsatisfactory character" was much approved of by the latter. Te Water appealed to Chamberlain "to set aside pride, prejudice, and even those feelings of false honor which in the face of the ultimate calamity would be ashes in other men's mouths. I told him that we and millions of men and women gave him our admiration and confidence and looked to him to stand firm against the influences of disruption". Te Water reported that Chamberlain seemed very moved by his appeal and stated he would try once more to find a peaceful solution to the crisis. To apply further pressure, te Water warned Chamberlain that another war would "endanger the future unity and cohesion of the Commonwealth", stating it would strengthen the appeal of the extreme Afrikaner nationalists who had neither forgotten nor forgiven the Boer War.

On 28 September 1938, te Water reported to Pretoria that there was a breakthrough in the crisis as Mussolini had proposed an emergency summit in Munich, which Hitler, Chamberlain and Daladier had all agreed to attend. Te Water wrote: "I believe the situation has been saved". When Chamberlain boarded the plane that was to take him to Munich, te Water together with Massey were there to wish well in Munich. However, te Water found fault with Beneš who was complaining that he had not been invited to attend the Munich conference. The Dominion high commissioners as a group appealed to Halifax to send a "very stiff" telegram to Sir Basil Newton, the British minister in Prague, to say "that the obstructive tactics of the Czech government were unwelcome to the British and Dominion governments". Both Massey and te Water wanted to remove the sentence asking Beneš "not to tie Chamberlain's hands" as that suggested that Beneš had that power, which both Massey and te Water insisted that he did not. Te Water cast Beneš as the principal problem, saying that he refused to understand the Munich conference would probably "whittle down" Chamberlain's most recent offers instead of expanding them in favor of Czechoslovakia. On 29 September 1938, the day before the conference in Munich, te Water argued: "If the states of the Commonwealth are to be used to preserve the balance of power in Europe the system must inevitably break ... collective action for the preservation of peace would work. Collective action for the making of war will break it". The Munich conference ended the crisis and when Chamberlain flew back from Munich to land at Heston airport to make his famous statement that he had secured "peace in our time", te Water was there to congratulate him. Te Water praised the Munich Agreement as a "considerable advance", noting that Hitler had backed down from his more extreme demands made in the Bad Godesberg ultimatum.

The fact that Hitler had not raised the question of the former German colonies in Africa once during the Sudetenland crisis was a source of much relief to te Water who was afraid that Chamberlain might promise Hitler that South West Africa would be returned to Germany. Te Water hoped that Hitler's interests were in Eastern Europe, not Africa, and was looking forward to an Anglo-German agreement whereby Britain would accept Eastern Europe as being in the German sphere of influence in exchange for Germany dropping its demand for the return of its former colonies in Africa. In October 1938, Hertzog proposed that South Africa pay Germany a certain sum in gold and cash to be determined to drop its demand for the return of South West Africa, a plan that te Water approved of. Te Water wrote in October 1938: "It would be sheer lust if Europe went to war now". Te Water had read Mein Kampf and reported to Hertzog that Hitler's advocacy of an anti-Soviet Anglo-German alliance in Mein Kampf gave him significant hope that such an alliance might actually occur in the near-future, now the Munich Agreement had apparently resolved the main issues between Germany and Britain. Te Water painted a picture to Hertzog of a world dominated by an Anglo-German alliance which would maintain white supremacy around the globe and keep the dreaded Soviet Union at bay. Like many other white South Africans at the time, te Water viewed the rising anti-colonial movements around the world, such as the Indian independence movement, as a threat to his much cherished principles of white supremacy. After the Munich agreement was signed, te Water reported that Maisky had told him of his "unutterable disgust with the Chamberlain policy" and stated his fears that the Munich Agreement was a start of a four-power alliance of Britain, Italy, France and Germany meant to isolate the Soviet Union. Te Water added that he believed that the Labour Party's leaders such as Clement Attlee and Ernest Bevin shared Maisky's views. In late 1938, the South African Defense Minister Oswald Pirow visited Berlin to discuss with Hitler the offer that South Africa pay Germany to cease its demand for the return of South West Africa, saying that the South Africa was prepared to offer the Reich much gold to cease its demand for South West Africa. It came as a considerable shock to Herzog when Pirow reported that Hitler was not interested as der Führer maintained that South West Africa was German once and it would inevitably be German again. Hitler's rejection of Herzog's offer increased the influence of the pro-British elements in the South African cabinet led by the former prime minister Jan Smuts, who argued that the German demand for South West Africa did make Germany into a threat to South Africa.

== The Danzig crisis ==
On 15 March 1939, Germany violated the Munich Agreement by occupying the Czech half of the rump of Czecho-Slovakia (as Czechoslovakia had been renamed in October 1938). Te Water reported to Pretoria that the British public opinion was outraged by this egregious violation of the Munich Agreement and that "appeasement is dead". Te Water reported that prior to 15 March 1939, he had known many British officials and leaders from Prime Minister Chamberlain on down who believed that Hitler could be trusted to keep his word, but that after 15 March 1939 no-one in Whitehall trusted Hitler. On 31 March 1939, Chamberlain issued the famous "guarantee" of Poland during a speech in the House of Commons, saying that Britain would go to war if the independence of Poland was threatened. Te Water was opposed to the "guarantee" of Poland, telling Chamberlain that he considered it rash and unwise. Te Water further complained that Chamberlain had issued the "guarantee" without telling him in advance, which he found to be highly rude, saying that the British government should treat the South African government as an equal. Te Water together with Massey both told Chamberlain during the same meeting that Germany "had a genuine claim to Danzig", which made it an "extremely bad reason" to risk a war over. At a meeting with Sir Thomas Inskip, te Water was more abusive and rude, lecturing him in an angry tone that Hitler should be given "one more chance of saving face", and felt that the "guarantee" was a provocation of Germany that should not have been made. By this point, te Water's arrogance had notably increased after almost ten years in London, and many British officials were finding him increasingly unpleasant to deal with.

During the Danzig crisis of 1939, te Water was broadly supportive of British plans for a "peace front" to deter Germany from war, but was adamantly opposed to including the Soviet Union in the "peace front". During a visit to 10 Downing Street, te Water told Chamberlain it was completely unacceptable for both him and his government to have the Soviet Union join the "peace front" and asked him to stop the negotiations with Moscow, warning darkly that any Anglo-Soviet alliance would be highly dangerous. The German media and government obsessively attacked the proposed "peace front" of 1939 as "encirclement" of the Reich, using the same phrase that had been used before 1914, which led te Water to urge that the work of building the "peace front" to be done cautiously and slowly. Te Water believed that a peaceful settlement of the Danzig crisis could be arranged and felt the best outcome would be for Britain to pressure Poland to allow the Free City of Danzig to "go home to the Reich".

Unlike in 1938, the Chamberlain put less attention to te Water. In 1938, only prime minister Michael Joseph Savage of New Zealand had promised to go to war if Britain did. By contrast, the situation in 1939 was very different. Prime minister Lyons of Australia had died in April 1939 and his successor as prime minister, Robert Menzies, was much more supportive of Britain. It was accepted in London that should the Danzig crisis should lead to a war, both Australia and New Zealand could be counted upon to declare war on Germany. Mackenzie King was vacillating and equivocal as usual, refusing to give a straight answer about what he would do if Britain declared war, but a Royal visit by King George VI and Queen Elizabeth to Canada in the summer of 1939 had been a great success, leading to huge pro-British demonstrations. The royal visit had been a success even in Quebec where the King was tactful enough to give his speeches in French. It was felt that Canadian public opinion would force Mackenzie King's hand. Only South Africa was considered to be a "wild card" as it was well known that Hertzog wanted to declare neutrality in the event of war, but Sir William Clerk, the British high commissioner in Pretoria, believed that pressure from the Anglos (white South Africans of British descent) and pro-British Afrikaners would "probably" bring South Africa into the war. However, even if Hertzog did succeed in declaring neutrality, having New Zealand, Australia and Canada in the war was considered to be a vast improvement in 1938 when only New Zealand had firmly committed itself to going to war. Through te Water was still considered the most able of the high commissioners in London, his views were given less attention in 1939 as compared to 1938.

During much of the summer of 1939, te Water was out of London on an extended vacation in Ireland, which weakened his influence with the Chamberlain government. Only on 23 August 1939, did te Water return to London, where the main thrust of his diplomacy was to argue that Poland was the principal problem in refusing to allow Danzig to rejoin Germany, and to argue that Britain should pressure Poland in the same manner that it had pressured Czechoslovakia. On 25 August 1939, Lord Halifax had a meeting with the Dominion high commissioners in London, whom he privately disparaged as "nervous Nellies". Directing his attention primarily at Massey, Bruce and te Water, Halifax blamed the Danzig crisis on Hitler. Against the demands of Bruce, Massey and te Water for more British pressure on Poland to make concessions, Halifax described Hitler as irrational and unreasonable, saying his entire worldview was based on his belief in the right of the "virile, growing German race" to expansion and that his philosophy was a "might is right" philosophy under which the strong nations dominated weak nations.

In September 1939, when the Danzig crisis led to World War Two, Hertzog attempted to have South Africa declare neutrality, leading to a crisis in Pretoria that Hertzog deposed as prime minister while the new Anglophile prime minister, Jan Smuts declared war on Germany. Hertzog's motion for neutrality in parliament saw 67 MPs vote for neutrality while another 80 MPs led by the former prime minister Smuts voted for war. Hertzog then went to the Governor-General Sir Patrick Duncan to ask him to dissolve parliament for a general election (which he expected to win, running on a platform calling for South African neutrality); instead Duncan dismissed Hertzog as prime minister and appointed Smuts as the new prime minister. One of Smuts's first acts as prime minister to sack te Water, who was closely associated with Hertzog, as the South African high commissioner in London. Te Water for his part was embittered by what he saw as an illegal action on the part of Duncan in dismissing Hertzog and had already submitted his resignation in protest.

== Apologist for apartheid ==
He was Ambassador at large for South Africa between 1948 and 1949. In 1948, the Afrikaner nationalist National Party won the elections and the new Prime Minister D. F. Malan brought in a new policy towards the non-white populations of South Africa called apartheid (Afrikaans for "apartness"), a policy of racial segregation that consigned the non-white peoples of South Africa to a second-class status. Even in 1948, the policy of apartheid caused criticism of South Africa and as such Malan appointed te Water as his special ambassador with the instructions to justify apartheid as a just and rational policy. At the time, te Water lamented that South Africa was facing worldwide criticism, which he blamed on the critics of the National Party government, saying at present in this difficult situation: "we have now unhappily intruded our domestic party quarrels, with inexcusable shortsightedness and to the delight of our detractors. We have exported our disunity around the world". As such, te Water toured the world, arguing the case for apartheid. Te Water not only supported apartheid, but also advocated to Malan that South Africa expel the entire Indo-South African population to the newly independent nation of India, a procedure he very misleadingly called "voluntary reparation", arguing that the Indo-South Africans were a danger to white supremacy in South Africa by their very presence. The fact that India was especially outspoken in its criticism of apartheid led te Water to perceive India as one of South Africa's principal enemies.

Te Water as the "roving ambassador" had orders from Malan "to put matters in the right light". Te Water's main mission was secure acceptance of the "Africa Charter" intended to secure white supremacy for all of Africa permanently by having the colonial powers in Africa sign the Africa Charter. The five points of the "Africa Charter" were:

- To protect Africa "from Asian domination" by preventing all Asian immigration to Africa. The South African government was seized with the fear of the "Yellow Peril" and was convinced that millions of Chinese together with millions of Indians were about to immigrate to Africa to challenge white supremacy.
- To secure "Africa for Africans", which was defined in the Africa charter as ensuring: "Africa should be safeguarded for the European because he has borne civilization on his shoulders...For the rest, Africa should be for the benefit of the natives". However, the Africa charter went on to state to rule Africa "for the benefit of the natives" required the permanent exclusion of all black Africans from politics as the charter stated that black Africans were incapable of governing themselves, thus requiring white control. Through Malan was an anti-British Afrikaner nationalist, in an irony that appeared to escape him, the Africa charter explicitly stated that Britain or any of the other colonial powers should never grant independence to any of their African colonies on the basis of majority rule.
- To ensure that Africa developed along "western Christian lines" as the charter called upon turning "Africa into a reserve...for the future development of Western European Christian civilization".
- To keep Communism out of Africa by signing a military alliance against the Soviet Union while ensuring that police forces and intelligence services of the nations that signed the Africa Charter co-operated against Communists everywhere in Africa.
- To ensure that Africa was "non-militarised", which was defined in the charter as ensuring that black Africans never be armed. The Africa Charter stated: "Do not allow the natives of Africa to be armed. One does not hand a rifle to a child." The Africa Charter stated it was acceptable for colonial governments to allow black Africans to serve in the military, but never as combat troops as the charter expressly stated that blacks must never allowed to have weapons of any sort.

The Africa Charter was a response to the fear in South Africa that one day the European powers might grant independence to their African colonies, which would inevitably lead to demands for equality from black South Africans. Additionally, the fact that the British, the Belgians, the Spanish, the Portuguese and especially the French had recruited Africans into their respective armies while arming them was a source of much worry for the South African government, which was strongly opposed to blacks being armed.

In September 1948, te Water held a series of meetings in London with what he called the "lords of the press", whose purpose was find out the reasons for "their papers' persistent unfriendliness towards all things South African" and to change the media coverage of South Africa. Te Water had known many British media magnates since his time as high commissioner in London and seemed to have been genuinely strung by the criticism of apartheid. Besides for defending apartheid, te Water during his trip to London pushed for ambitious scheme for Anglo-South African military alliance under which South Africa would take the responsibility for defending all of the British African colonies from the Soviet Union in exchange for which Britain would use its influence throughout the world to dampen criticism of apartheid. In a speech, te Water called for an "Africa Charter" that would be the basis of a NATO-style alliance that would unite South Africa with all of the colonial powers in Africa such as Britain, France, Belgium, Spain, and Portugal that was ostensibly to directed against the Soviet Union, but in fact aimed at upholding white supremacy throughout all of Africa. Through South Africa did not declare itself a republic until 1961, there was considerable mistrust in London of the republican and anti-British tendencies in the National Party government in Pretoria, and the "Africa Plan" as it was known went nowhere. However, te Water signed secret agreements with the British and Belgian governments under which the three governments agreed to share intelligence about the activities of African nationalists. During the same trip, te Water visited Lisbon to meet the Portuguese prime minister António de Oliveira Salazar. Te Water stressed the advantage of Portuguese-South African co-operation, saying both nations were committed to upholding white supremacy and that South African investment would benefit the Portuguese colonies of Angola and Portuguese East Africa (modern Mozambique). The Portuguese colonies in Africa were regarded not as colonies in Lisbon, but rather as integral parts of Portugal with the Salazar regime bringing in massive numbers of Portuguese settlers to "whiten" its African colonies. Salazar was polite towards te Water, but cool to his idea of South African investment in Portuguese Africa, which he saw as a threat to Portugal's hold onto its colonies.

During a visit to New York, te Water represented South Africa at the newly founded United Nations (UN), where he fought hard to have the word dignity removed from the United Nations Universal Declaration of Human Rights during its drafting stage. Te Water stated that "dignity had no universal standard and that it was not a 'right'". As such, te Water announced that the opening sentence of the proposed declaration saying "All human beings are born free and equal in dignity and rights" was completely unacceptable and wanted it removed from the declaration. Te Water was a powerful speaker and his motion to remove dignity from the declaration "so electrified" the meeting that Eleanor Roosevelt, the chairwoman of the committee, was afraid it might pass as the majority of the delegates approved of te Water's speech. Roosevelt "protested" angrily against te Water's speech and to stop his motion from passing adjured the meeting to give herself more time to rebut his speech. In a speech two days later, Roosevelt told te Water that the statement about dignity was necessary to underlay the claim that humans have any rights at all to begin with. Roosevelt argued that she had included the word dignity in the declaration to emphasize that every human being in the world was worthy of respect. Charles Malik, the head of the Lebanese delegation at the United Nations and one of the drafters of the Universal Declaration in response stated one of the principal authors of the United Nations Charter was Prime Minister Jan Smuts of South Arica who had inserted the word dignity into the UN charter in 1945, leading him to say he found very undignified that the present South African government was trying to undo the work of Smuts. Te Water in response stated that Smuts's South Africa was no more, as the new National Party government had already started taking away the limited rights that the nonwhite population of South Africa enjoyed. Over te Water's objections who feared correctly that having dignity mentioned in the declaration would be used to criticize apartheid, the General Assembly adopted the Universal Declaration with its statement that dignity was a universal human right. In common with other South African leaders, te Water was wary of the United Nations. He objected to the fact that the Soviet Union was a permanent member of the UN Security Council while finding the fact that China was also a permanent member of the UN Security Council highly objectionable, stating that this weakened the case for global white supremacy. Even more worrying for te Water was that the League of Nations before its dissolution in 1946 had transferred all of its mandates over to the United Nations, thus meaning that South Africa as the administrating power for Southwest Africa now had to answer to the United Nations.

In December 1948, te Water visited Ottawa where he met the Canadian prime minister Louis St. Laurent to lobby him to have Canada vote against condemning South Africa at the United Nations for its apartheid policy, saying it greatly mattered to his government that the fellow members of the Commonwealth should stand with South Africa. The meeting went badly where te Water's argument that apartheid was justified because there was a natural "place" for the different races of South Africa was rejected by St. Laurent who stated that as a French-Canadian he knew of a similar theory in Canada which held that the natural "place" of French-Canadians was as the inferiors of English-Canadians. St. Laurent also declared that as a devout Catholic that it was his belief that Christ had died for the sins of all humanity and that God thus loved all of humanity, leading te Water to declare in some exasperation that he had come to Ottawa to discuss how to hold the Commonwealth together and to stop Communism in Africa by winning international support for apartheid, not to discuss "philosophical problems". St. Laurent told te Water "how opposed he was in principle to the philosophy which lay beyond the Union's racial policies", saying that Canada would vote at the UN to condemn South Africa for apartheid.

Te Water had more success during the American leg of his journey where his picture of apartheid as a mutually beneficial arrangement for all the people of South Africa was accepted by those committed to Jim Crow laws, but was criticized by American liberals. After his American visit, te Water reported to Pretoria that: "Our relations with the U.S. are expanding and will continue to grow and expand to the great advantage of the Union". Te Water felt that the way that American investors were rapidly replacing British investors as the principal foreign investors in South Africa would allow his nation to take a more assertive stance regarding the United Kingdom. In April 1949, te Water made a tour of European nations that had colonies in Africa together with much of Africa. During the African leg of his tour, te Water visited the British colonies of Uganda, Tanganyika (modern Tanzania), Kenya, Nyasaland (modern Malawi), Northern Rhodesia (modern Zambia) and Southern Rhodesia (modern Zimbabwe). During his tour, te Water appealed over the British colonial administration to the local white settlers, arguing that South Africa was the natural leader of all the white communities in Africa. The reaction of the settlers to his speeches suggested that many shared his viewpoint as already the white settlers were concerned that Britain might grant independence on the basis of majority rule. Sir Alfred Vincent, one of the leaders of the British settlers in Kenya hailed South Africa after a speech by te Water in Nairobi as the leader of the white communities in Africa, whom all the whites should follow.

During his visit to Egypt, te Water made a speech in Cairo calling for an "organic" approach to African problems, saying South Africa should work with the colonial governments together with independent African governments such as Egypt on such issues as soil conservation, transport and above all the economy. South Africa with the vast wealth generated by the Witwatersrand gold mines and the Kimberly diamond fields had easily the most developed economy in Africa, and te Water believed that his "organic approach" would bring in much of Africa into the South African sphere of influence. Te Water believed that the British would one day grant independence to their African colonies, and he expected to be along the same lines that South Africa had been granted Dominion status in 1910, namely on the basis of minority rule with only the whites being allowed to vote and hold office. As te Water knew that South Africa could not seize the British colonies, he felt that his "organic approach" would lay the foundations of a South African sphere of influence across Africa. Te Water visited Egypt just after the Egyptians had been defeated in the first Arab-Israeli war, and discovered during his meeting with King Farouck and his ministers that their main preoccupation was with avenging Egypt's defeat at the hands of Israel. The Witwatersrand Gold Rush of the 1880s-1890s had led to a large number of East European Jews settling in Johannesburg, making that city into one of the largest Jewish cities in Africa. Te Water found that the Egyptians had a morbid mistrust of South Africa on the account of its Jewish population, whom it was believed in Cairo to be Zionists who had supported Israel. The Egyptians did agree to te Water's request that Egypt and South Africa establish diplomatic relations. The British government was opposed to te Water's "organic approach", seeing his plans as a way to subtly shift British Africa into the South African sphere of influence, which all the worrying because of the anti-British and republican tendencies within the National Party.

Te Water was awarded an honorary doctor of laws degree by Wits University in 1955. Chancellor of the University of Pretoria between 1949 and 1964, Charles Te Water died in Cape Town on 6 June 1964, at the age of 77.

Diplomatic posts
Preceded by Paul Hymans	President of the League of Nations; 1933–1934	Succeeded by Rickard Sandler
Academic offices
Preceded by Hendrik van der Bijl	Chancellor of the University of Pretoria; 1949–1964	Succeeded by Hilgard Muller
