= Minister of International Relations and Cooperation =

South African political office

South Africa Minister of International Relations and Cooperation
- Flag of South Africa

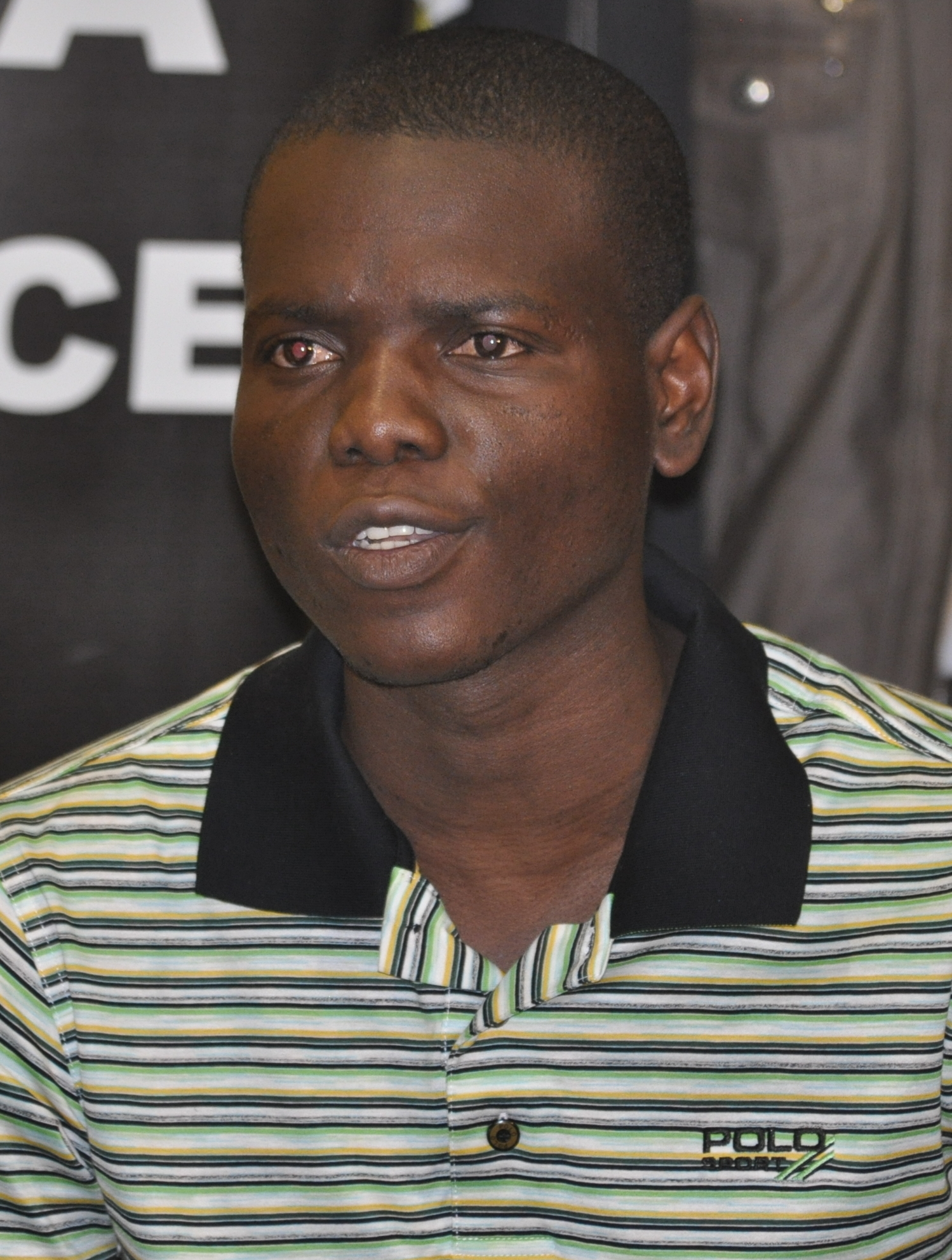
- Incumbent; Ronald Lamola since 30 June 2024
- Department of International Relations and Cooperation
- Style: The Honourable
- Appointer: Cyril Ramaphosa
- Inaugural holder: J. B. M. Hertzog
- Formation: 1927
- Deputy: Alvin Botes; Thandi Moraka
- Salary: R 2,211,937
- Website: Department of International Relations and Cooperation

The Minister of International Relations and Cooperation is the foreign minister of the South African government, with political responsibility for South Africa's foreign relations and the Department of International Relations and Cooperation. The present minister is Ronald Lamola, who was appointed by President Cyril Ramaphosa on 30 June 2024.

After the creation of the Union of South Africa as a British dominion in 1910, its foreign relations were initially carried out by the British Foreign Office. However, in 1927 the South African government established a Department of External Affairs. From 1927 until 1955, the prime minister also served as foreign minister.

== List of foreign ministers of South Africa ==
Minister	Party	Incumbency	Under
J. B. M. Hertzog	NP/UP	1927–1939	The foreign ministry was held by the Prime Minister
Jan Smuts	UP*	1939–1948	The foreign ministry was held by the Prime Minister
D. F. Malan	NP	1948–1954	The foreign ministry was held by the Prime Minister
J. G. Strijdom	NP	1954–1955	The foreign ministry was held by the Prime Minister
Eric Louw	NP	1955–1958	Government of Prime Minister J. G. Strijdom
Eric Louw	NP	1958–1964	Government of Prime Minister Hendrik Verwoerd
Hilgard Muller	NP	1964–1966	Government of Prime Minister Hendrik Verwoerd
Hilgard Muller	NP	1966–1977	Government of Prime Minister B. J. Vorster
Pik Botha	NP	1977–1978	Government of Prime Minister B. J. Vorster
Pik Botha	NP	1978–1984	Government of Prime Minister P. W. Botha
Pik Botha	NP	1984–1989	Government of State President P. W. Botha
Pik Botha	NP	1989–1994	Government of State President F. W. de Klerk
Alfred Baphethuxolo Nzo	ANC	1994–1999	Government of President Nelson Mandela
Nkosazana Dlamini-Zuma	ANC	1999–2008	Government of President Thabo Mbeki
Nkosazana Dlamini-Zuma	ANC	2008–2009	Government of President Kgalema Motlanthe
Maite Nkoana-Mashabane	ANC	11 May 2009 – 26 February 2018	Government of President Jacob Zuma
Lindiwe Sisulu	ANC	27 February 2018 – 29 May 2019	Government of President Cyril Ramaphosa
Naledi Pandor	ANC	30 May 2019 – 30 June 2024	Government of President Cyril Ramaphosa
Ronald Lamola	ANC	30 June 2024 – present	Government of President Cyril Ramaphosa
