= Pik Botha =

South African politician (1932–2018)

Pik Botha DMS MP
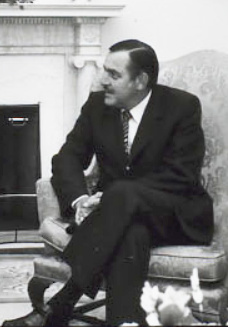
- Botha in 1981

Minister of Mineral and Energy Affairs
- In office 27 April 1994 – May 1996
- President: Nelson Mandela
- Preceded by: George Bartlett
- Succeeded by: Penuel Maduna

Deputy Leader of the National Party in Transvaal
- In office 1987–1996
- Leader: F. W. de Klerk

Minister of Foreign Affairs
- In office 27 April 1977 – 10 May 1994
- President: F. W. de Klerk (1989–94); P. W. Botha (1984–89)
- Prime Minister: P. W. Botha (1978–84); B.J. Vorster (1966–78)
- Preceded by: Hilgard Muller
- Succeeded by: Alfred Nzo

Member of Parliament
- In office 1977–1994
- Constituency: Westdene
- In office 22 April 1970 – 1974
- Constituency: Wonderboom, Pretoria

South African Ambassador to the United States
- In office 30 July 1975 – 11 May 1977
- Prime Minister: B.J. Vorster
- Preceded by: Johan Samuel Frederick Botha
- Succeeded by: Donald Bell Sole

Personal details
- Born: Roelof Frederik Botha; 27 April 1932 Rustenburg, Transvaal, Union of South Africa
- Died: 12 October 2018 (aged 86) Pretoria, Gauteng, South Africa
- Party: National (until 1997)
- Spouses: Helena Susanna Bosman (m. 1953; died 1996) Ina Joubert (m. 1998)
- Children: 4
- Education: University of Pretoria
- Occupation: Diplomat and politician
- Profession: Law

Roelof Frederik "Pik" Botha, DMS MP (27 April 1932 – 12 October 2018) was a South African politician who served as the country's foreign minister in the last years of the apartheid era, the longest-serving in South African history. Known as a liberal within the party, Botha served to present a friendly, conciliatory face on the regime, while criticised internally. He was a leading contender for the leadership of the National Party upon John Vorster's resignation in 1978, but was ultimately not chosen. Staying in the government after the first non-racial general election in 1994, he served under Nelson Mandela as Minister of Mineral and Energy Affairs from 1994 to 1996.

While testifying at the Truth and Reconciliation Commission, Botha was one of the few officials to repent for his involvement in the apartheid government. He said he'd realized that apartheid was morally wrong in the 1970s, but didn't do enough to "turn the tide" against the regime and prevent atrocities from being committed.

Botha was nicknamed 'Pik' (short for pikkewyn, Afrikaans for 'penguin') because of a perceived likeness to a penguin in his stance, accentuated when he wore a suit.

He was not related to Prime Minister (later State President) P. W. Botha, under whom he served as foreign minister for 11 years.

== Early life ==
Botha was born at Rustenburg in the Transvaal, to Roelof Frederik Botha and Maria Elizabeth Dreyer. At the age of four, he was struck by meningitis in Lourenço Marques (modern-day Maputo, Mozambique); he received treatment at a small hospital in Barberton, Transvaal, and his mother vowed that if he survived, he would become a church minister.

Botha attended Paul Kruger Primary School, where his father was principal. He excelled in high school, becoming chairman of the debating society and officer in the school cadets. Botha was also a writer of both prose and poetry in Afrikaans, and his writing supplemented his salary in his early years as a diplomat. In his first year studying law at the University of Pretoria, a theologian explained to him that God would not expect him to keep his mother's promise to become a church minister.

== Diplomatic and legal career ==
Botha began his career in the South African foreign service in 1953, serving in Sweden and West Germany. From 1963 to 1966, he served on the team representing South Africa at the International Court of Justice in The Hague in the matter of Ethiopia and Liberia v. South Africa, over the South African occupation of South-West Africa (now Namibia).

In 1966, Botha was appointed legal adviser at the Department of Foreign Affairs, in which capacity he served on the delegation representing South Africa at the United Nations from 1967 to 1977. In 1974, he was appointed South Africa's permanent representative to the United Nations and presented his credentials to Secretary-General Kurt Waldheim on 15 October 1974; in November of that year, however, South Africa was suspended from membership of the General Assembly and, over the ensuing years, the country was excluded from official participation in virtually all of the UN's organs and agencies.

== Political career ==
In the elections of 1970 and 1974, Botha was elected to the House of Assembly as MP for Wonderboom in the Transvaal. In 1975, he was appointed South Africa's Ambassador to the United States, in addition to his UN post. In 1977, he re-entered Parliament as MP for Westdene, and was appointed minister for foreign affairs by Prime Minister B. J. Vorster. He continued to represent Westdene for the remainder of his political career.

Botha entered the contest to be the leader of the National Party in 1978. He was allegedly considered Vorster's favourite and received superior public support among whites (We want Pik!) but withdrew after criticism concerning his young age, lack of experience (having spent 16 months as foreign minister) and alleged liberal beliefs as opposed to the ultra-conservative NP machinery (in which he lacked a significant position), instead throwing his support behind P. W. Botha, who was ultimately elected.

In 1985, Botha helped to draft a speech that would have announced common decision-making on all levels in a single constitutional unit and a formula for bringing about the release of Nelson Mandela, but this draft was rejected by P. W. Botha.

The next year, he stated publicly (during a press conference in Parliament, asked by German journalist Thomas Knemeyer) that it would be possible for South Africa to be ruled by a black president provided that there were guarantees for minority rights, but was quickly forced to acknowledge that this position did not reflect government policy. Botha recalled in 2011 that he had been "severely reprimanded and almost fired" over his remarks. In early 1986 he was also an instrumental figure in the South African government's negotiations with the Commonwealth Eminent Persons' Group (EPG). Although the Group's mission was aborted after the South African Military launched cross-border raids on ANC bases on 19 May, in the preceding months Pik Botha had engaged in extensive talks with the Group about a possible path to negotiations, including calls for a suspension of violence and the unbanning of the ANC.

Throughout 1988 Botha was instrumental in lengthy peace talks between South Africa, Cuba, and the People's Republic of Angola aimed at ending the South African Border War. On 13 December 1988, Botha and Defence Minister Magnus Malan ratified the Brazzaville Protocol, which led to the effective cessation of hostilities in that conflict.

=== Namibian independence ===
On 22 December 1988, Botha signed the Tripartite Accord involving Angola, Cuba and South Africa at United Nations headquarters in New York City which led to the implementation of Security Council Resolution 435, and to South Africa's granting of independence to Namibia.

On 21 December 1988, Botha, with a 22-strong South African delegation from Johannesburg, was initially booked to travel to the Namibian independence ratification ceremony in New York on Pan Am Flight 103 from London. Instead, the booking was cancelled as he and six delegates took an earlier flight, thereby avoiding the fatal PA103 bombing over Lockerbie, Scotland.

=== National unity ===
Botha subsequently served as Minister of Mineral and Energy Affairs in South Africa's first post-apartheid government from 1994 to 1996 under President Nelson Mandela. Botha had first met Mandela in May 1990 at the historic Groote Schuur Minute, and was highly impressed by Mandela's knowledge of Afrikaner history.

Botha became deputy leader of the National Party in the Transvaal from 1987 to 1996. He retired from politics in 1996 when F. W. de Klerk withdrew the National Party from the government of national unity.

While testifying at the Truth and Reconciliation Commission, Botha was one of the few officials to repent for his involvement in the apartheid government. He said he'd realized that apartheid was morally wrong in the 1970s, but didn't do enough to "turn the tide" against the regime and prevent atrocities from being committed, which he blamed on South African security forces.

In 2000, Botha declared his support for President Thabo Mbeki.

In 2013, Botha expressed criticism for the government's affirmative action policies saying that the South African government of 1994 would never have reached a constitutional settlement with the ANC had it insisted on its current affirmative action programme. In an interview on affirmative action, Botha publicly declared that he had never been a member of the ANC, and would not join under its current policies.

On 12 December 2013, Botha appeared on the BBC's Question Time, hosted in Johannesburg, discussing the life and legacy of Nelson Mandela.

== Personal life ==
Botha married Helena Bosman in 1953, with whom he had two daughters, Anna Hertzog and the artist Lien Botha as well as two sons, the rock musician Piet Botha (1955-2019) and the economist Roelof Botha. Among Botha's eight grandchildren is grandson Arend Botha theologian and musician, and Roelof Botha, former CFO of PayPal. Helena died in 1996, after having been ill, including being partially paralysed, following a fall in her home in 1991. Two years later, Botha married Ina Joubert, a former journalist with the SABC.

Botha died of natural causes at his home in Pretoria on 12 October 2018 at the age of 86.

== Awards ==
- South Africa: Order of Good Hope in the Grand Cross Class (March 1980)
- Taiwan: Order of Brilliant Star with Grand Cordon (October 1980)
- South Africa: Decoration for Meritorious Service (July 1981)

Political offices
Preceded by Hilgard Muller	Minister of Foreign Affairs; 1977–1994	Succeeded by Alfred Nzo
