= Eric Louw =

South African diplomat and politician (1890–1968)

Eric Hendrik Louw
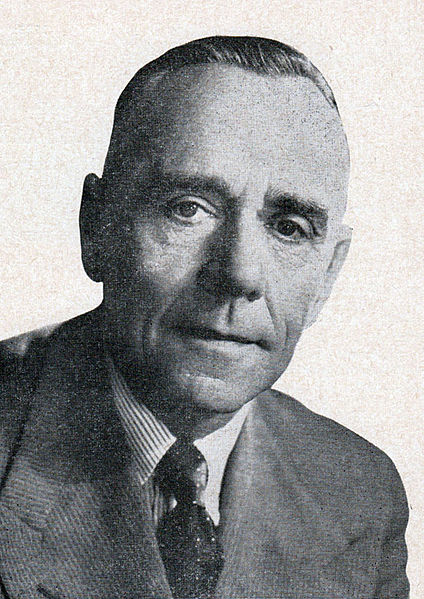

Minister of Foreign Affairs
- In office 10 January 1955 – 1963
- Prime Minister: J. G. Strijdom; H. F. Verwoerd
- Preceded by: J. G. Strijdom
- Succeeded by: Hilgard Muller

Minister of Finance
- In office 1954–1956
- Prime Minister: J. G. Strijdom
- Preceded by: Nicolaas Havenga
- Succeeded by: Tom Naudé

Personal details
- Born: 21 November 1890 Jacobsdal, Orange Free State
- Died: 24 June 1968 (aged 77) Cape Town, South Africa
- Party: National Party
- Education: Rhodes University
- Occupation: Lawyer

Eric Hendrik Louw (21 November 1890 – 24 June 1968) was a South African diplomat and politician. He served as the Minister of Finance from 1954 to 1956, and as the Minister of Foreign Affairs from 1955 to 1963.

== Early life ==
He was born in Jacobsdal in the Orange Free State on 21 November 1890 to a Boer family. He obtained a Bachelor of Arts degree at the then Victoria College, Stellenbosch. He went on to qualify as an advocate at Rhodes University College; Grahamstown, where he also practised. In 1915, when his father died at Beaufort West, he took over the business interests. In Beaufort West, Louw was a member of the chamber of commence.

Louw became active in protesting against Jewish immigration to South Africa, depicting the East European Jewish immigrants as scheming and dishonest merchants who were driving the Afrikaner families into poverty. Like many other Afrikaner nationalists at the time, he saw die volk ("the people" as the Afrikaners liked to call Afrikanerdom) as under threat from a number of perceived enemies. Throughout his life, opposition to Jewish immigration was the leitmotiv of his career. A very short man who appeared to have a Napoleon complex, Louw was intensely ambitious and saw himself as a future prime minister. His picture of die volk as under threat from the Jewish immigrants was at least in part a gambit to build a following to allow him to be prime minister.

== Politician and diplomat ==
In 1924 he was elected to the House of Assembly as MP for Beaufort West, and the following year became South Africa's first Trade Commissioner in the United States and Canada. In 1929 he became High Commissioner in London and a year later South Africa's first envoy to the United States. Louw, a republican Afrikaner nationalist, had stormy relations with the British during his time as high commissioner, accounting for his short term as he was appointed high commissioner in March 1929 and had resigned by November 1929, stating it was simply impossible for him to work with British officials. Louw's resignation was a great relief not only to himself, but also to the British officials who were glad to see him gone. Louw was replaced as high commissioner by Charles te Water, a diplomat of similar views, but considerably more suave and sophisticated than Louw as well more patient as te Water was willing to wait for the right time to proclaim South Africa a republic.

After he had represented his country in Italy, France and Portugal and had been South Africa's first representative to the League of Nations, he returned to South Africa for political reasons. During his time in Paris, despite his belief in white supremacy, Louw was cordial enough when speaking to black French people at various balls and parties, apparently out of a desire not to create an incident which would cause unfavorable coverage of South Africa in the French press. Like all the other South African diplomats in Europe, Louw objected very strongly to the recruitment of black Africans into the French Army. Most of Louw's time in Paris was spent lobbying fruitlessly against the French concept of la force noire ("the black force"), arguing that the French Army should not be arming Africans. As the South African minister-plenipotentiary in Paris, Louw advocated very strongly against accepting Jewish refugees into South Africa. Louw was in close contact with Stefanus Gie, the very pro-Nazi South African minister-plenipotentiary in Berlin, who shared his antisemitism.

In January 1936, Louw submitted to the South African prime minister General J. B. M. Hertzog a "Memorandum on European Emigration To South Africa" that was co-signed by himself; Gie; te Water; Wilhelm Heymans, the minister-plenipotentiary in Rome; and Hermann van Broekhuizen, the minister-plenipotentiary in The Hague. The memo is more commonly known as the "te Water Memorandum" as te Water was the best known South African diplomat in the world at the time, but in fact Louw wrote most of the memo. The memo warned that South Africa was on the verge of receiving a massive number of European Jews, which the document stated were of "...a type in question that does not inspire confidence. Can South Africa without detriment and even danger to its national interests continue to allow its commerce and related vocations to be fed by recruits of this type from overseas?" The memo ended with the warning that continuing Jewish immigration would affect "the future racial, social and economic structures of White South Africa", and advised ending Jewish immigration at once.

In 1938 he was again elected Member of Parliament for Beaufort West for the Purified National Party. Hermann Bohle, the father of Ernst Wilhelm Bohle, the chief of the Overseas Office of the NSDAP, wrote after meeting Louw in an evaluation for the Auswärtiges Amt that he was "the so-called Streicher of South Africa", the leader of the militantly anti-Semitic wing of the Purified National Party. Bohle wrote with disgust that Louw had written to Hertzog asking to be reappointed to his post as "minister in Paris" in case he lost the election. Bohle concluded his evaluation with a clear distaste for Louw: "This lack of character is typically South African, hence in Germany, one should have little faith in all South Africans, and only allow oneself to be guided by absolute facts". In a 1939 speech in Parliament, Louw stated about the Danzig crisis: "I am convinced that if it were possible to remove Jewish influence and pressure from the press and from the news agencies, the international outlook would be considerably brighter than it is today."

During the Second World War, Louw, like most of his party, was pro-Nazi. He was also a member of the fascist Ossewabrandwag (OB), serving on the Ossewabrandwag's provincial committee for the Cape province. In a 1940 speech in Beaufort West, Louw stated: "The establishment of the OB will contribute especially to the co-ordination of Afrikanerdom's fighting forces. The Afrikaner struggle is being fought on three fronts - the political front, the economic front and the language and cultural front. All three of these fronts are part of the struggle which it has been waging for a century against powers and influences from without... There must, however, be co-ordination or co-operation between the forces of struggle against all three fronts. The OB offers the means for such co-operation". In another speech in 1940, Louw called for South Africa to become a republic, saying: "Without a doubt radical changes will take part in the political as well as the economic and social spheres. New world conditions have brought to light defects in the democratic system and a certain measure of rot has set in" (emphasis in the original).

In 1945, when a Johannesburg Jewish group stated it was willing to pay the costs to send a delegation of South African MPs to inspect the newly liberated concentration camps of Buchenwald and Dachau, Louw was vehemently opposed to such a tour. Louw suggested that the newsreels and photographs of starving concentration camp survivors were "fake" propaganda designed to discredit Nazi Germany, making such a tour unnecessary in his viewpoint. Louw also argued that the money offered by the Jewish group be better spent republishing Emily Hobhouse's 1927 book War Without Glamour, which he argued documented the horror of the concentration camps that the British created during the Second Boer War to hold Boer civilians, which he argued was the "real" genocide.

In early 1948, Louw wrote a pamphlet for the National Party entitled Die Kommunistiese Gevaar in Afrikaans and The Communist Danger in English for the coming elections of that year. In the pamphlet, Louw warned that "white Christian civilization" in South Africa was in mortal peril from the South African Communist Party. Louw wrote that Communists were atheists who believed in racial equality and "miscegenation", as he called interracial sex, and argued that a Communist government would be the end of "white Christian civilization". Louw lambasted the South African prime minister Jan Smuts as being blind to the "Communist danger" as he accused Smuts of ignoring the fact that South African blacks were joining the Communist Party. Louw wrote that Smuts was content to "let things develop" instead of banning the South African Communist Party as he wanted. Louw accused Smuts of being a "comrade" of Stalin, quoting extensively from remarks that Smuts had made during World War II praising Stalin. Louw ended his pamphlet with the call for all South African whites, whatever they be Afrikaners or Anglos, to vote for the National Party.

== Minister ==
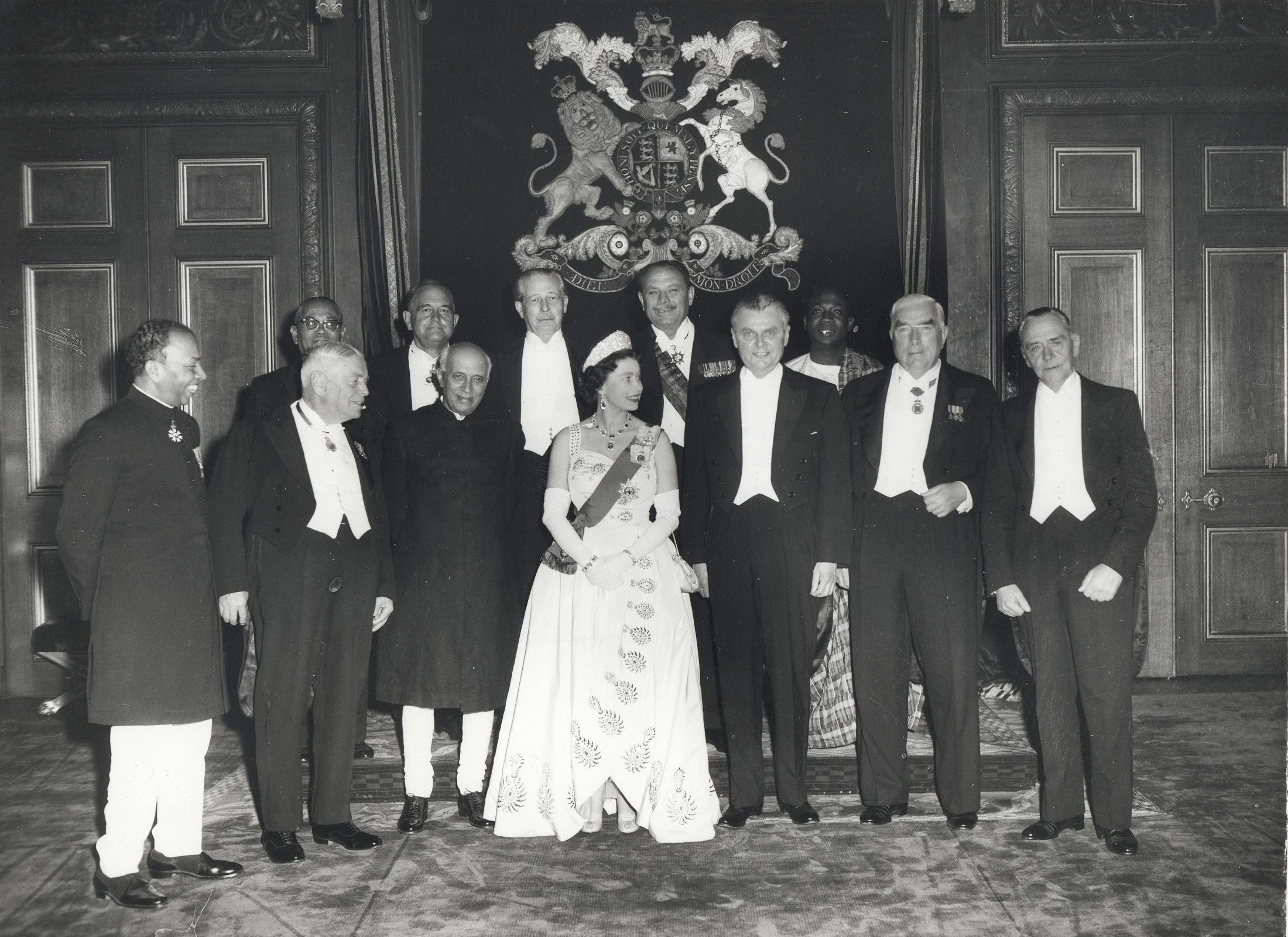
Eric Louw (first row, far right) together with Queen Elizabeth II and the Prime Ministers of the Commonwealth of Nations during the 1960 Commonwealth Prime Ministers' Conference.

When the National Party won the general election in 1948, he was an obvious choice for the cabinet, firstly as Minister of Economic Affairs, then, from 1955, as Minister of Finance and from 1957 as Minister of Foreign Affairs. He was best known as South Africa's representative at the UN, Commonwealth and other overseas conferences. Between 1948 and 1962 he represented South Africa at the UN on eight occasions. Previously, South African prime ministers had acted as their own foreign ministers, and Louw was the first South African foreign minister in his own right. Through Louw could be charming when he wanted to be, he was well known as a combative man with an explosive temper who was widely disliked within the South African diplomatic corps. Louw was told by the prime minister J. G. Strijdom to "breathe fire and enthusiasm" into the foreign ministry, which he proceeded to do. The historians' James Barber and John Barratt wrote: "For the first time, there was a foreign minister and a forceful one, responsible for foreign affairs, who was backed by an expanding department staffed by able men".

Louw attached an especial importance to relations with the United States. By the time he became foreign minister, American investment was growing at the expense of British investment as the principal source of foreign capital, which was welcomed by the Afrikaner nationalists as a way to reduce British influence in South Africa. Louw was very concerned by criticism of South Africa within the United States and one of his first acts was to increase the budget for the foreign ministry's information service, which was responsible for South Africa's image abroad. Louw also hired six Madison Avenue advertising agencies to run ad campaigns depicting South Africa as a benevolent society whose apartheid system worked for the mutual benefit of both blacks and whites. Louw also hired the Films of the Nation Inc, a maker of short educational films to make a series of documentaries that portrayed South Africa as a happy nation. To apply pressure on Capitol Hill, Louw hired the lobbying firms of Dow, Lohnes & Albertson and Krock-Erwin Associates to lobby both houses of the United States Congress for South Africa.

Noboth Mokgatle, a black South African anti-apartheid activist described Louw as having a "fascist frame of mind" as he was one of the leaders of the extreme right-wing National Party committed to upholding white supremacy in South Africa. Mokgate recalled that Louw was utterly against black South Africans being recruited into the South African Army, ostensibly because Louw claimed that blacks were uncapable of being soldiers, but in reality because he did not want black men to have access to guns. Louw paid a visit to the Belgian Congo (the modern Democratic Republic of the Congo) and at the airport in Leopoldville (modern Kinshasa) was greeted by an all-black honor guard of the Force Publique. Mokgate used the photograph of Louw inspecting the honor guard in Leopoldville in one of his speeches, saying "Look at the cheat and hypocritic Eric Louw". Mokgate added: "You Europeans have allowed yourselves to be misled by him...This picture in the newspapers is an admission he has been telling you lies". Mokgate argued that if blacks were competent to serve in the Force Publique, then there was no reason why black men should be excluded from the South African Army. Louw's anti-Semitism made his elevation to the cabinet a matter of much concern to the South African Jewish community who unsuccessfully lobbied to have Louw kept out of the cabinet.

At the 1957 Commonwealth Prime Ministers' Conference, Louw met Prime Minister Kwame Nkrumah of Ghana, the first of the British colonies in black Africa to become independent. Through Nkrumah was an icon of Pan-African nationalism and of Black pride, he agreed with Louw that the Commonwealth conference was an "inappropriate" venue for discussing apartheid. Despite expectations, Louw and Nkrumah got along well as the two men were both nationalists who struggled against Britain in various ways and both agreed on the "danger of Communism". In 1958, Nkrumah tried to establish diplomatic relations between Accra and Pretoria, only to be rebuffed by Louw who did not want a black high commissioner in Pretoria who would be formally his equal at diplomatic functions. Hendrik Frensch Verwoerd, who became the South African prime minister in 1958, felt that South Africa already made concessions by establishing diplomatic relations with Egypt and the Republic of China (Taiwan) and was willing to allow diplomatic relations with India and Pakistan if those nations were willing to establish diplomatic ties, but was adamantly against having diplomatic relations with any black African nation. South Africa's relations with the Republic of China were stained in the 1950s-1960s owing to the blatantly discriminatory policies pursued against the Chinese South African minority who like the Indo-South Africans were classified as belonging to the Asian legal category under apartheid, while relations with Egypt were broken off in 1961. It was a major issue in Taiwan-South Africa relations that the Orange Free State, one of the four provinces of South Africa, did not allow any Asians onto its soil owing to a law passed in 1885 which was not repealed until 1986.

Louw had a major impact on Canadian relations when he met with the Prime Minister of Canada John Diefenbaker at the 1957 and 1958 Commonwealth conferences. Diefenbaker had asked Louw to give some voting privileges to coloured people (under apartheid, "colored people" were a legal category consisting of people of mixed race descent-the term "coloured people" did not refer to black people). Louw refused as he maintained that Canada did not even allow their Native population the right to vote. Louw was only partially correct; since 1876, non-status Canadian Indians who lived off the reservations had been allowed to vote and hold office, but status Indians who lived on the reservations were disfranchised. In the 1958 Canadian federal election this was an election issue, and Diefenbaker passed the Canadian Bill of Rights and modified the Citizenship and Indian Act to give full citizenship to status Indians in Canada. These laws were changed in 1959. These changes made it harder for Canada to say no to the forcing the expulsion/withdrawal of South Africa from the Commonwealth.

On 30 October 1958, the American delegation at the United Nations for first time ever voted for a general assembly resolution condemning apartheid. Louw was extremely unhappy about the American vote and vented his fury at the American ambassador to South Africa, Henry Byroade. Louw charged that it was only because of domestic pressure from African American groups that led to the American vote for the resolution, an accusation that Byroade did not attempt to deny. Byroade told Louw that it could "hardly be denied that our problems at home had made people more aware of and think about racial problems than in the years of the recent past".

As Minister of Foreign Affairs he assisted Prime Minister Verwoerd at the historic 1960 Commonwealth Prime Ministers' Conference in London in 1961, when South Africa withdrew her membership. At the 1961 session of the United Nations, Louw represented South Africa when he became involved in stormy debates with the Indian delegation who objected to the treatment of the Indo-South African population under apartheid. Louw had a reputation as a "hard man", and his speeches at the UN were noted for their virulent tone as he aggressively defended apartheid. Louw's speeches before the UN General Assembly claiming that the United Nations did not have the right to discuss apartheid ended in defeat with the 45 nations voting for the Indian motion to discuss apartheid; 8 nations abstained from the vote; and only Australia, Belgium, France, Portugal, and Luxembourg voted with South Africa in maintaining that apartheid was an internal South African matter. At the UN Security Council, an Indian motion calling apartheid a danger to the peace of Africa was passed 9 votes to zero, with both Britain and France abstaining from the vote.

In October 1961, while at the United Nations, Louw was involved in a violent debate on the floor of the UN General Assembly with the delegations from a number of black African nations about the merits of apartheid. Time magazine reported that Louw's speech on the UN floor was "a provocative whitewash of his country's apartheid policy". His thesis was summed by Time as: "South Africa's rigidly repressed blacks are actually enjoying blissful freedom and enlightened education". Louw argued that the criticism of South Africa from the Soviet delegation was spurious because the Soviet Union "conveniently ignores conditions existing in Hungary and in the Soviet Union's occupied or colonial territories." Louw depicted the newly independent African nations as falling into the Soviet sphere of influence, saying: "The ruler of Ghana is flirting with Moscow and Peking. Guinea, soon after being given its independence, promptly became a disciple of Moscow. Mali appears to be going the same way." Louw argued that criticism of apartheid from the delegations from the two oldest black African nations, Liberia and Ethiopia, was invalid as he claimed that living conditions in both Liberia and Ethiopia were "appalling". He mocked the African states for their poverty, noting that the total promised contribution of black African states towards the UN's budget was 2 1/4% of the total budget for 1961 and that most of the sums had not been paid."

A motion to censure Louw issued by the Liberian ambassador Henry Ford Cooper passed on the floor of the general assembly, and Louw took much umbrage over the fact that Arieh Eshel, the Israeli ambassador to the UN, had voted for the motion to censure him. Cooper's motion censuring Louw stated that he had given a speech that was "offensive, fictitious and erroneous" on the floor of the UN General Assembly. Press coverage of the censure vote was sympatethic towards Louw. Time magazine in its edition of 20 October 1961 condemned the censure of Louw as "...an alarming display of emotionalism and political immaturity" by "Africa's new nations".

In a speech on South African radio, Louw implicitly criticized the South African Jewish community for Israel's vote to censure him, saying that he hoped that those "South Africans who have racial and religious ties to Israel" should "disapprove of the hostile and ungraceful" actions of Israel. Louw's speech with its implication that South African Jews had a duty to criticise Israel and if they did not that they must have dual loyalties threw the South African Jewish community into a state of panic. Simha Pratt, the Israeli ambassador to Pretoria, reported "I saw before me panicky people, gripped by fear and without a backbone" as dozens upon dozens of South African Jews arrived at his office to tell him that Israel's vote at the UN had made life very difficult for them and that Israel must not criticise apartheid as Louw was an anti-Semite who always looking for any chance to lash out at the Jewish community. On 31 December 1963 he relinquished his post as Minister of Foreign Affairs.

== Honours and awards ==
He was awarded an honorary doctorate by the University of Pretoria in 1962. He was similarly honoured by the University of the Orange Free State in 1963. In 1965 a bronze bust of him by Hennie Potgieter was unveiled at Beaufort West in a school which bore his name until it was amalgamated with Niko Brummer Primary School in 1994. A high school in the town of Musina in Limpopo also bears his name.

== Death ==
Louw died on June 24, 1968, in Cape Town.

== Books and articles ==
- Borstelmann, Thomas (2009). The Cold War and the Color Line American Race Relations in the Global Arena. Cambridge: Harvard University Press. ISBN 9780674028548.
- Bloomberg, Charles (1989). Christian Nationalism and the Rise of the Afrikaner Broederbond in South Africa, 1918-48. London: Palgrave Macmillan. ISBN 9781349106943.
- Wheeler, Tom (2005). History of the South African Department of Foreign Affairs 1927-1993. Johannesburg: South African Institute of International Affairs.
- Furlong, Patrick (2004). "The Berlin Connection". In Matthew Feldman, Roger Griffin (ed.). Fascism Critical Concepts in Political Science. London: Routelege. pp. 359–382. ISBN 9780415290197.
- Graham Fry, Michael (1999). "Agents and Structures: The Dominions and the Czechoslovak Crisis, September 1938". In Igor Lukes; Erik Goldstein (eds.). The Munich Crisis, 1938 Prelude to World War II. London: Frank Cass. pp. 293–341. ISBN 0-7146-8056-7.
- Grundy, Kenneth (2020). Confrontation and Accommodation in Southern Africa. Los Angeles: University of California Press. ISBN 978-0520370579.
- Mokgatle, Noboth (1971). The Autobiography of an Unknown South African. Los Angeles: University of California Press. ISBN 9780520361881.
- Muller, C.F. (1986). Five Hundred Years: A History of South Africa. Washington, D.C.: Academica. ISBN 0868742716.
- Nixon, Ron (2016). Selling Apartheid: South Africa's Global Propaganda War. New York: Pluto Press. ISBN 978-0745399140.
- Osada, Masako (2002). Sanctions and Honorary Whites: Diplomatic Policies and Economic Realities in Relations Between Japan and South Africa. Westport: Greenwood Publishing Group. ISBN 0313318778.
- Shain, Milton (1996). "South Africa". In David Wyman and Charles H. Rosenzveig (ed.). The World Reacts to the Holocaust. Baltimore: Johns Hopkins Press. pp. 670–692. ISBN 9780801849695.
- Shain, Milton (2015). A Perfect Storm: Antisemitism in South Africa 1930–1948. Cape Town: Jonathan Ball Publishers. ISBN 978-1-86842-701-7.
- Shimoni, Gideon (2003). Community and Conscience The Jews in Apartheid South Africa. Waltham: Brandeis University Press". ISBN 9781584653295.
- Stultz, Newell Maynard (1974). Afrikaner Politics in South Africa, 1934-1948. Los Angeles: University of California Press.
- Yap, Melanie; Leong Man, Dianne (1996). Colour, Confusion and Concessions The History of the Chinese in South Africa. Hong Kong: Hong Kong University Press. ISBN 9789622094246.

Government offices
Preceded by Nicolaas Havenga	Minister of Finance; 1954–1956	Succeeded by Tom Naudé
Preceded by J. G. Strijdom as Prime Minister	Minister of Foreign Affairs; 1955–1964	Succeeded by Hilgard Muller
