= High Commission of South Africa, London =

Diplomatic mission from South Africa to the United Kingdom

High Commission of South Africa in London
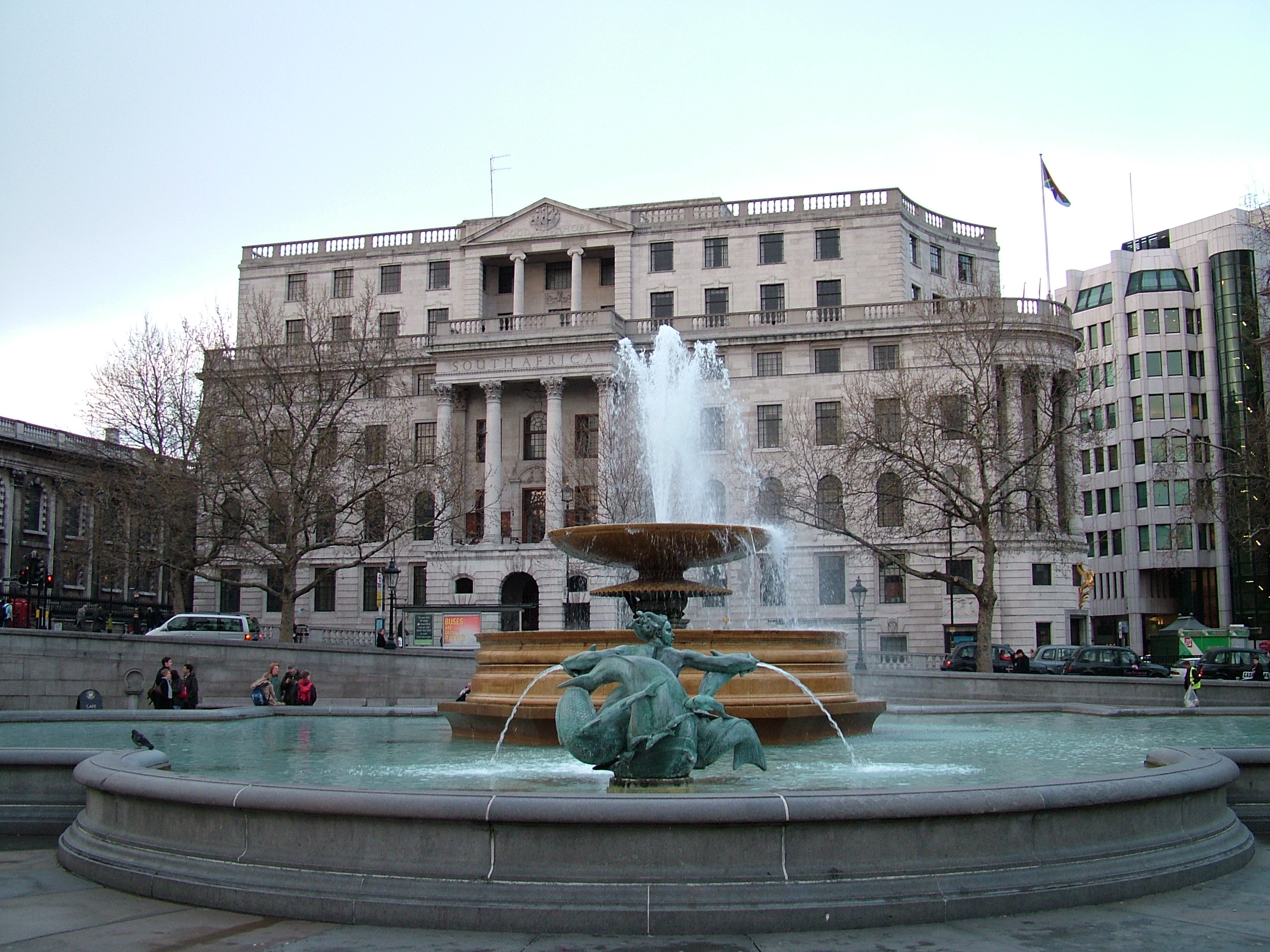
- Location: Trafalgar Square, London
- Address: Trafalgar Square, London, WC2N 5DP
- Coordinates: 51.5082°N 0.1269°W
- High Commissioner: HE Mr Jeremiah Nyamane Mamabolo

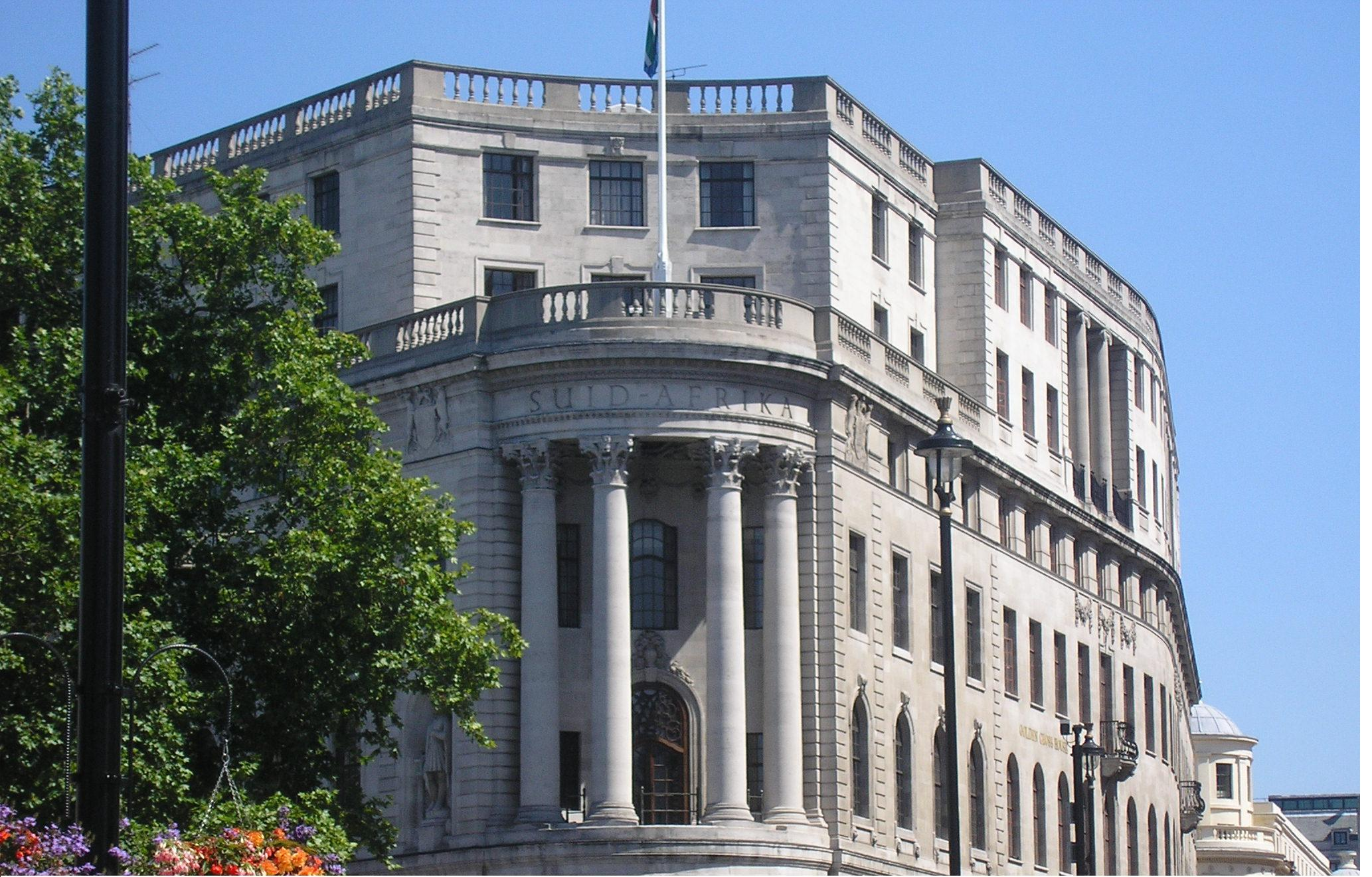
Balcony of South Africa House

The High Commission of South Africa in London is the diplomatic mission from South Africa to the United Kingdom. It is located at South Africa House, a building on Trafalgar Square, London. As well as containing the offices of the High Commissioner, the building also hosts the South African consulate. It has been a Grade II* listed building since 1982.

== History ==
South Africa House was built by Holland, Hannen & Cubitts in the 1930s on the site of what had been Morley's Hotel. The building was designed by Sir Herbert Baker, with architectural sculpture by Coert Steynberg and Sir Charles Wheeler, and opened in 1933. The building was acquired by the government of South Africa as its main diplomatic presence in the UK. During World War II, Prime Minister Jan Smuts lived there while conducting South Africa's war plans.

In 1961, South Africa became a republic, and withdrew from the Commonwealth due to its policy of racial segregation. Accordingly, the building became an embassy, rather than a High Commission. During the 1980s, the building, which was one of the only South African diplomatic missions in a public area, was targeted by protesters from around the world. There were long vigils held outside the entrance in Trafalgar Square during the 1980s, culminating in a four-year non-stop vigil for the release of all political prisoners in South Africa. One of these protests was incidentally included in a Pet Shop Boys video. During the 1990 Poll Tax Riots, the building was set alight by rioters, although not seriously damaged.

The first fully free democratic elections in South Africa were held on 27 April 1994, and four days later the country rejoined the Commonwealth, 33 years to the day after it withdrew upon becoming a republic. Along with country's diplomatic missions in other Commonwealth countries, the mission once again became a High Commission.

Today, South Africa House is no longer a controversial site, and is the focal point of South African culture in the UK. South African President Nelson Mandela appeared on the balcony of South Africa House in 1996, as part of his official UK state visit. In 2001, Mandela again appeared on the balcony of South Africa House to mark the seventh anniversary of Freedom Day, when the apartheid system was officially abolished.

== See also ==
- List of diplomatic missions of South Africa
- List of ambassadors and high commissioners of South Africa to the United Kingdom
- High Commission of Canada in the United Kingdom
- High Commission of Uganda, London
