= Jeremiah Kingsley Mamabolo =

South African diplomat

Jeremiah Kingsley Mamabolo is the Acting Joint Special Representative for Darfur and Head of the United Nations-African Union Mission in Darfur (UNAMID). Prior to this appointment of 12 January 2017 by United Nations Secretary-General António Guterres, Mr. Mamabolo was the Deputy Joint Special Representative (Political) for UNAMID.

== Biographical Information ==
Having served as the Deputy Joint Special Representative for UNAMID since 2016, Mr. Mamabolo brings first-hand experience to this position having overseen the legal, political and human rights aspects of the missions’ work. Prior to this appointment, from 2013 to 2016, he served as Permanent Representative of South Africa to the United Nations where he also served as acting Chair of the “Group of 77” developing countries and China. He was appointed High Commissioner of South Africa to Nigeria in 2009 and played an instrumental role in the peace processes in Burundi and the Democratic Republic of the Congo. From 1999 to 2002, he served as the Permanent Representative to the African Union and led reconciliation efforts in post-war Sierra Leone. From 1995 to 1999, he served as High Commissioner to Zimbabwe. Mr. Mamabolo is a graduate of the University of Pretoria with a master's degree in public administration. He also holds a diploma in journalism from Harare Polytechnic College.
