= Hilgard Muller =

South African politician (1914–1985)

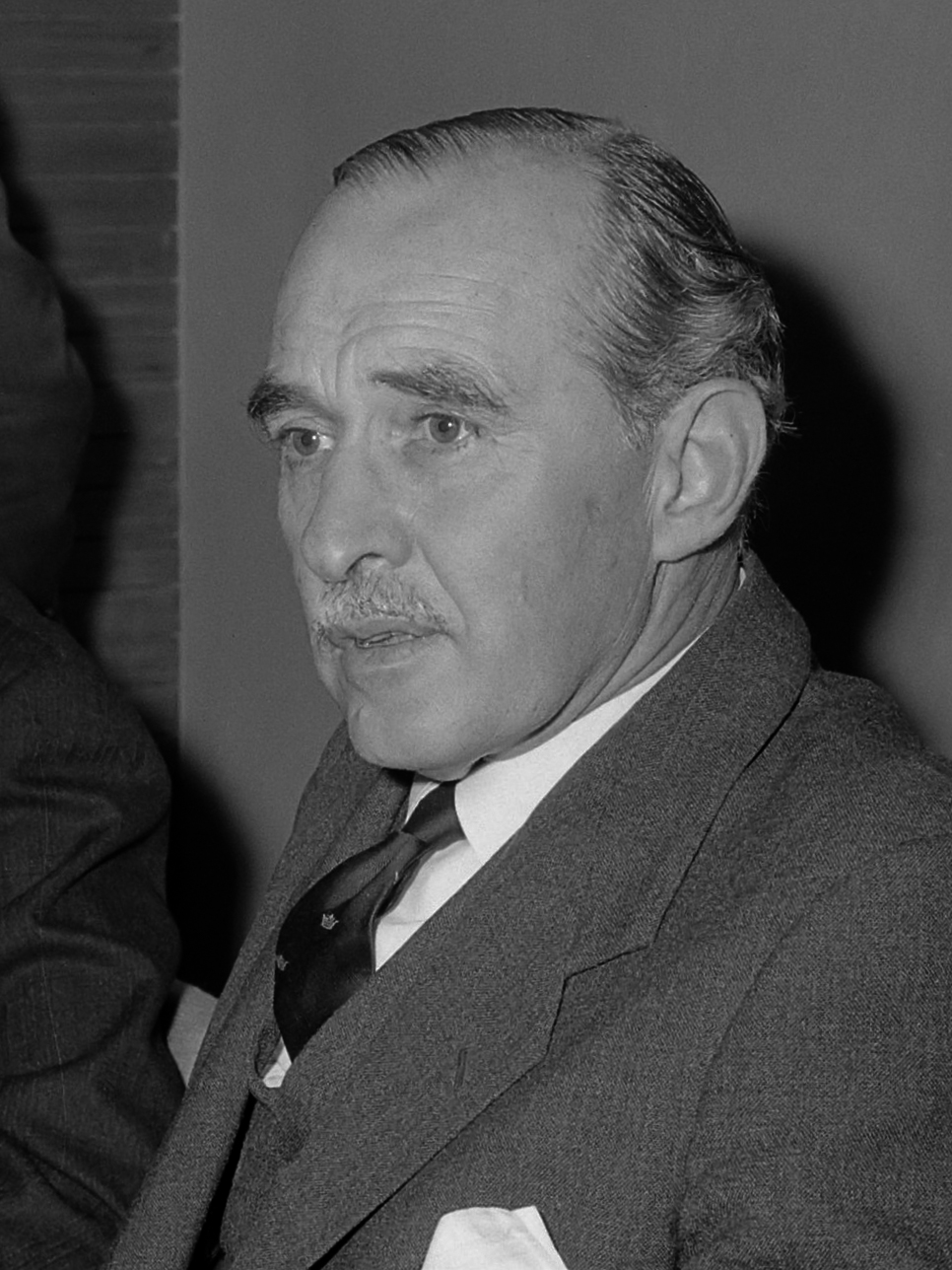
- Hilgard Muller (1964)

Minister of Foreign Affairs
- In office 9 January 1964 – 1 April 1977
- Preceded by: Eric Louw
- Succeeded by: Pik Botha

South African Ambassador to Portugal simultaneously accredited to Spain
- In office 1958–1961

South African Ambassador to the United Kingdom
- In office 1961–1964

Personal details
- Born: 4 May 1914 Potchefstroom, Transvaal, Union of South Africa
- Died: 10 July 1985 (aged 71) Pretoria, South Africa
- Party: National Party
- Education: University of Oxford
- Occupation: Lawyer

Hilgard Muller, DMS (4 May 1914 – 10 July 1985) was a South African politician of the National Party, Mayor of Pretoria in 1953–1955, elected an MP in 1958, appointed Minister of Foreign Affairs after the resignation of Eric Louw in 1964. He relinquished both posts in 1977. Studying at the University of Pretoria, he obtained a Rhodes Scholarship at the University of Oxford, earning a doctorate in law. Practicing law in Pretoria, he was elected to Pretoria city council in 1951, becoming Mayor of the city two years later. He relinquished his city council seat in 1957, being elected to House of Assembly the following year for Pretoria East. He chose not to run for his seat again in 1961, instead being appointed South African ambassador in London, but returned to parliament in 1964 immediately to be appointed Minister of Foreign Affairs.

Muller retired to private life in 1977 and was succeeded by Frederik Roelof "Pik" Botha, who kept the post until multi-racial elections in 1994.

Government offices
Preceded by Eric Louw	Minister of Foreign Affairs; 1964–1977	Succeeded by Pik Botha
Academic offices
Preceded by Charles te Water	Chancellor of the University of Pretoria; 1965–1984	Succeeded by Alwyn Schlebusch
