= Timeline of the Commonwealth of Nations =

This is a timeline of the Commonwealth of Nations from the Balfour Declaration of 1926. Some regard the Balfour Declaration as the foundation of the modern Commonwealth.

== 1920s (from 1926) ==
Year	Date	Event
1926	25 October	The Balfour Declaration of 1926 establishes the principle of the separate and equal status of the Dominions within the British Empire, "freely associated as members of the British Commonwealth".
1927	12 April	The Royal and Parliamentary Titles Act 1927 changes the title of the British monarch, to reflect the secession of most of the isle of Ireland from the United Kingdom in 1922 to create the Irish Free State.

== 1930s ==
Year	Date	Event
1930	16 August	The first British Empire Games, the forerunners of the Commonwealth Games, open in Hamilton, Canada.
1930	1 October	seventh Imperial Conference convenes in London. Meeting drafts what becomes the Statute of Westminster 1931.
1931	11 December	The Statute of Westminster 1931 is enacted, formalises the Balfour Declaration 1926, with the Parliament of the United Kingdom renouncing legislative power over the dominions. It is adopted by Canada, the Irish Free State, Newfoundland, and the Union of South Africa. Australia and New Zealand decline to adopt it until 1942 and 1947 respectively.
1932	21 July	The British Empire Economic Conference in Ottawa, Canada is convened. Policy of Imperial preference adopted. This marks the last participation of the Government of the Irish Free State directly in British Commonwealth affairs.
1934	16 February	The self-government of the Dominion of Newfoundland is suspended, replaced by the Commission of Government. Newfoundland ceases to be an independent member of the British Commonwealth, having reverted to being a British colony.
1934	4 August	The second British Empire Games open in London, the United Kingdom.
1936	20 January	King George V dies, being succeeded by Edward VIII.
1936	10 December	King Edward VIII signs the instruments of abdication, effective the next day.
1936	11 December	The United Kingdom passes His Majesty's Declaration of Abdication Act 1936 (which, at the request of those countries' Parliaments, equally applies to Australia, New Zealand, and South Africa), effecting Edward VIII's abdication and succession by George VI. Canada passes the Succession to the Throne Act to the same effect.
1936	11 December	The Constitution (Amendment No. 27) Act 1936 of the Irish Free State comes into effect, removing reference to the King in the Constitution.
1936	12 December	The Irish Free State passes the Executive Authority (External Relations) Act 1936, conferring statutory functions on the British monarch and recognising George VI as Edward VIII's successor, one day after the rest of the British Commonwealth.
1937	14 May to 24 June	eighth and final Imperial Conference held in London following the coronation of King George VI; rejects concept of Imperial Federation.
1937	29 December	A new Irish constitution is promulgated establishing the state under the name 'Ireland', creating the position of President, and calling into question whether Ireland still formed part of His Majesty's Dominions.
1938	5 February	The third British Empire Games open in Sydney, Australia.
1939	1 September	Nazi Germany invades Poland, precipitating an ultimatum from the United Kingdom, which was ignored by Germany, leading inexorably to the Second World War.
1939	2 September	Irish Taoiseach Éamon de Valera announces his intention to remain neutral in the impending war, regardless of British policy. The government declares the Emergency.
1939	3 September	The United Kingdom declares war upon Nazi Germany, beginning the British Empire and the British Commonwealth's involvement in the six-year conflict.
1939	3 September	The Australian Statute of Westminster Adoption Act 1942 (see below) was backdated to this date.
1939	4 September	South Africa's United Party refuses to accept Prime Minister Barry Hertzog's declaration of neutrality in the war, and vote to replace him as party leader and Prime Minister of South Africa with Jan Smuts.
1939	6 September	South Africa declares war upon Nazi Germany, becoming the first Dominion to do so independently of the United Kingdom.
1939	9 September	Canada declares war upon Nazi Germany.

== 1940s ==
Year	Date	Event
1942	9 October	Australia passes the Statute of Westminster Adoption Act 1942, adopting the Statute of Westminster 1931, but back-dating it to 3 September 1939, when the United Kingdom (and therefore Australia) declared war upon Nazi Germany.
1944	1 May	The first Commonwealth Prime Ministers' Conference convenes in London.
1945	4 April	A Commonwealth Statesmen's Meeting convenes in London to co-ordinate members' demands and expectations of the impending end of the war.
1945	8 May	Nazi Germany surrenders to the Allied Powers, ending the Second World War in Europe.
1945	15 August	The Empire of Japan surrenders to the Allied Powers, ending the Second World War.
1946	21 February	The British Commonwealth Occupation Force is formed from Australian, British, Indian, and New Zealand occupation forces in Japan.
1946	23 April	The second Commonwealth Prime Ministers Conference convenes in London.
1947	3 February	In response to Canada's passage the previous year of the Canadian Citizenship Act the previous year, a Commonwealth conference on nationality and citizenship is convened. It is agreed to redefine the concept of citizenship in the Commonwealth so that, rather than all those in the British Empire and Commonwealth being British subjects, each Commonwealth state is free to also define its own separate citizenship. As a result, the British Nationality Act 1948 is passed the next year by the British parliament which creates a distinction in that country between British citizens and British subjects; Australia and New Zealand also pass their own citizenship acts. Eventually, the category of British subject develops into that of a Commonwealth citizen whose rights are greater than those of a foreign national but often less than one of a full citizen of the country in question. Ireland had already passed citizenship legislation in 1935 defining its own citizenship laws.
1947	15 August	India joins the British Commonwealth upon being granted independence by the United Kingdom. Pakistan (including modern Bangladesh) joins the British Commonwealth following the Partition of India.
1947	21 October	India and Pakistan begin the first Indo-Pakistani War, over the princely state of Kashmir and Jammu. It is the first armed conflict between two members of the British Commonwealth, albeit one with King George VI as King of both Dominions.
1947	25 November	New Zealand passes the Statute of Westminster Adoption Act 1947.
1948	4 February	Dominion of Ceylon (modern-day Sri Lanka) joins the Commonwealth upon being granted independence by the United Kingdom.
1948	16 June	Three European plantation managers are killed in Perak, sparking the Malayan Emergency, leading to deployment of Commonwealth soldiers to Malaya.
1948	11 October	The third Commonwealth Prime Ministers' Conference convenes in London.
1948	31 December	India and Pakistan sign a cease-fire, ending the first Indo-Pakistani War.
1949	31 March	Newfoundland, a Dominion until 1934, joins Canada as a province.
1949	18 April	Ireland ceases to be regarded as a member of the British Commonwealth by the member countries. They took this view on the basis that the Republic of Ireland Act 1948 had come into effect. The legislation ended the statutory role of the British monarchy in Ireland. In contrast, Irish leaders had long regarded Ireland as a republic outside the Commonwealth but associated with it. Until Ireland's declaration of the republic, only Dominions could be members of the British Commonwealth.
1949	22 April	The fourth Commonwealth Prime Ministers' Conference convenes in London. The agenda is dominated by the imminence of India becoming a republic and its future within the Commonwealth.
1949	28 April	The Commonwealth Heads of Government issue the London Declaration. It allows India (and, thenceafter, all other members) to remain in the Commonwealth as a republic, creates the position of Head of the Commonwealth, and changes the name of the organisation to the Commonwealth of Nations. The decisions of the 1947 Commonwealth ministerial conference on nationality and citizenship are affirmed which allow states to create their own citizenship rules. Indians are agreed to be recognised as Commonwealth citizens, rather than British subjects, once India becomes a republic.

== 1950s ==
Year	Date	Event
1950	26 January	India becomes a republic, being the first republic in the Commonwealth of Nations.
1950	4 February	The fourth British Empire Games open in Auckland, New Zealand. These would be the last under that name.
1951	4 January	The fifth Commonwealth Prime Ministers' Conference convenes in London.
1951	28 July	The 1st Commonwealth Division is created to amalgamate Australian, British, Canadian, Indian, and New Zealand forces engaged in the Korean War.
1952	6 February	King George VI dies, being succeeded as monarch of the United Kingdom, Canada, Australia, New Zealand, Ceylon, Pakistan and South Africa by Queen Elizabeth II, as well as Head of the Commonwealth.
1952	28 April	The British Commonwealth Occupation Force is officially disbanded, having transferred control of Far Eastern forces to British Commonwealth Forces Korea.
1952	20 October	Sir Evelyn Baring, Governor of Kenya, declares a state of emergency, recognising the severity of the Mau Mau Uprising.
1952	28 November	Commonwealth Prime Ministers' Economic Conference convenes in London to discuss proposals to expand trade within the Commonwealth.
1953	3 June	The sixth Commonwealth Prime Ministers' Conference convenes in London.
1954	30 July	The British Empire Games are renamed the 'British Empire and Commonwealth Games', with the opening of the 1954 Games in Vancouver, British Columbia, Canada.
1955	26 January	The seventh Commonwealth Prime Ministers' Conference convenes in London.
1956	27 June	The eighth Commonwealth Prime Ministers' Conference convenes in London.
1957	6 March	Dominion of Ghana, previously the Gold Coast, joins the Commonwealth upon being granted independence by the United Kingdom, becoming the first majority-ruled African member.
1957	26 June	The ninth Commonwealth Prime Ministers' Conference convenes in London. The new Canadian prime minister, John Diefenbaker, proposes the intensification of trade relations within the Commonwealth. His call for an Empire Trade Conference are resisted by the British government which has an eye towards the UK developing stronger trade relations with Europe and the newly formed European Economic Community. However, a Commonwealth Trade and Economic Conference is called for the next year.
1957	31 August	The Federation of Malaya joins the Commonwealth upon being granted independence by the United Kingdom. It is the first native monarchy in the Commonwealth except for the Commonwealth realms.
1958	3 January	The Federation of the West Indies is formed from the British West Indies as a self-governing colony.
1958	30 July	The 1958 British Empire and Commonwealth Games open in Cardiff, the United Kingdom.
1958	28 September	The Commonwealth Trade and Economic Conference concludes with a communique agreeing that the pound sterling should be made fully convertible and that trade barriers within the Commonwealth should be progressively removed.

== 1960s ==
Year	Date	Event
1960	3 February	British Prime Minister Harold Macmillan issues his 'Wind of Change' speech to the Parliament of South Africa in Cape Town.
1960	3 May	The tenth Commonwealth Prime Ministers' Conference convenes in London; Malaya demands South Africa's expulsion from the Commonwealth due to its racial policies.
1960	1 October	Nigeria joins the Commonwealth upon being granted independence by the United Kingdom.
1961	8 March	The 11th Commonwealth Prime Ministers' Conference convenes in London. The Union of South Africa's application to request to remain in the Commonwealth upon becoming a republic is rejected due to the country's policy of apartheid. Prime Minister Hendrik Verwoerd left the conference upon being forced to pull South Africa's application.
1961	13 March	Cyprus joins the Commonwealth, having gained independence from the United Kingdom the previous year. Heavily opposed by the United Kingdom, it is the first small country to join. Archbishop Makarios III, the President of Cyprus became a Commonwealth head of government as well as a Commonwealth head of state.
1961	27 April	Dominion of Sierra Leone joins the Commonwealth upon being granted independence by the United Kingdom.
1961	31 May	South Africa becomes a republic, temporarily withdrawing from the Commonwealth. South Africa remains out of the Commonwealth until 1 June 1994. Charles Robberts Swart, the last Governor-General of South Africa became the first State President of South Africa.
1961	9 December	Tanganyika, now part of Tanzania, joins the Commonwealth upon being granted independence by the United Kingdom.
1962	31 May	The Federation of the West Indies collapses. Its constituent states revert to being colonies of the United Kingdom, and preparations begin to grant them separate independence within the Commonwealth.
1962	6 August	Jamaica joins the Commonwealth upon being granted independence by the United Kingdom.
1962	31 August	Trinidad and Tobago joins the Commonwealth upon being granted independence by the United Kingdom.
1962	10 September	The 12th Commonwealth Prime Ministers' Conference convenes in London. Concerns of Commonwealth countries about the implications for trade and economic relations in regards to Britain's possible entry into the European Common Market is the main topic of discussion.
1962	9 October	Uganda joins the Commonwealth upon being granted independence by the United Kingdom.
1962	22 November	The 1962 British Empire and Commonwealth Games open in Perth, Australia.
1963	10 December	Sultanate of Zanzibar, now part of Tanzania, joins the Commonwealth upon being granted independence by the United Kingdom. It is, albeit briefly, the first hereditary monarchy in the Commonwealth except for the Commonwealth realms.
1963	12 December	Dominion of Kenya joins the Commonwealth upon being granted independence by the United Kingdom.
1964	26 April	Two Commonwealth members, Tanganyika and Zanzibar, merge to form the United Republic of Tanzania, which joins the Commonwealth.
1964	6 July	Dominion of Malawi, formerly Nyasaland, joins the Commonwealth upon being granted independence by the United Kingdom.
1964	8 July	The 13th Commonwealth Prime Ministers' Conference convenes in London. The leaders agree to a communique declaring the Commonwealth's commitment to racial equality and an end to discrimination. The idea of a Commonwealth Secretariat is proposed. The government of the colony of Southern Rhodesia, whose prime ministers had frequently attended Imperial and Commonwealth conferences since 1930, is excluded due to a decision to confine attendance at meetings to leaders of independent states.
1964	21 September	Malta joins the Commonwealth upon being granted independence by the United Kingdom.
1964	24 October	Zambia, formerly Northern Rhodesia, joins the Commonwealth upon being granted independence by the United Kingdom.
1965	18 February	The Gambia joins the Commonwealth upon being granted independence by the United Kingdom.
1965	17 June	The 14th Commonwealth Prime Ministers' Conference convenes in London. The Conference approves the creation of the Commonwealth Secretariat. The meeting also discusses the crisis in Rhodesia, relations with South Africa and Portuguese colonies in Africa, and opposition by Asian and African Commonwealth countries to British, Australian and New Zealand's support for American intervention in the Vietnam War. The Commonwealth reaffirms its declaration that all Commonwealth states should work for societies based on racial equality.
1965	1 July	The Commonwealth Secretariat is founded. The first Secretary-General is Canada's Arnold Smith.
1965	9 August	Singapore joins the Commonwealth upon being granted independence by Malaysia under the terms of the Independence of Singapore Agreement 1965.
1965	15 August	India and Pakistan begin the second Indo-Pakistani War, over the princely state of Kashmir and Jammu.
1965	23 September	India and Pakistan sign a cease-fire, ending the second Indo-Pakistani War.
1965	11 November	Rhodesia issues a Unilateral Declaration of Independence, which is rejected by the United Kingdom, sparking a 15-year crisis in the Commonwealth. Rhodesia is declared to remain a British colony under international law.
1965	12 December	The United Kingdom imposes full economic sanctions on Rhodesia.
1966	10 January	The 15th Commonwealth Prime Ministers' Conference convenes in Lagos, Nigeria to discuss the Rhodesian crisis. It was the first Conference held outside London.
1966	10 March	The Commonwealth Secretariat Act 1966 is passed, coming into effect retroactively on 1 July 1965, the date of the Secretariat's foundation, granting the Secretariat legal immunity in the United Kingdom.
1966	26 May	Guyana, formerly British Guiana, joins the Commonwealth upon being granted independence by the United Kingdom.
1966	4 August	The 1966 British Empire and Commonwealth Games open in Kingston, Jamaica. It was the first time the Games were held outside the so-called 'White Commonwealth', and the last time the Games included the British Empire in their name.
1966	6 September	The 16th Commonwealth Prime Ministers' Conference convenes in London. Discussion is again dominated by Rhodesia with the United Kingdom announcing NIBMAR policy towards the rogue British colony: refusing independence until the Black majority is given the vote.
1966	30 September	Botswana, formerly Bechuanaland Protectorate, joins the Commonwealth upon being granted independence by the United Kingdom.
1966	4 October	Lesotho, formerly Basutoland, joins the Commonwealth upon being granted independence by the United Kingdom. Lesotho is the first permanent hereditary native monarchy in the Commonwealth with the Paramount Chief of Basutoland, Moshoeshoe II becoming King of Lesotho.
1966	30 November	Barbados joins the Commonwealth upon being granted independence by the United Kingdom.
1968	31 January	Nauru joins the Commonwealth as a 'Special Member' upon being granted independence from a joint Australia-New Zealand-United Kingdom trusteeship. It is the first microstate to join.
1968	12 March	Dominion of Mauritius joins the Commonwealth upon being granted independence by the United Kingdom.
1968	6 September	Swaziland joins the Commonwealth upon being granted independence by the United Kingdom. Swaziland was the first absolute monarchy in the Commonwealth under King Sobhuza II
1969	7 January	The 17th and last Commonwealth Prime Ministers' Conference convenes in London and is again dominated by discussion of how to bring white minority rule in Rhodesia to an end. Also discussed is the Biafra crisis in Nigeria and discrimination against South Asian communities living in Africa and Black and Asian immigrants living in the UK.

== 1970s ==
Year	Date	Event
1970	2 March	Rhodesia declares itself a republic and a new constitution takes effect. Rhodesia's declaration as a republic remains invalid under international law.
1970	4 June	Tonga joins the Commonwealth upon being granted independence by the United Kingdom.
1970	1 July	Arnold Smith begins his second term as Commonwealth Secretary-General.
1970	16 July	The 1970 British Commonwealth Games open in Edinburgh, the United Kingdom. It was the first time the Games use the metric system.
1970	28 August	Western Samoa joins the Commonwealth, having gained independence from New Zealand in 1962.
1970	10 October	Dominion of Fiji joins the Commonwealth upon being granted independence by the United Kingdom.
1971	14 January	The first Commonwealth Heads of Government Meeting convenes in Singapore.
1971	22 January	At the conclusion of the first CHOGM, the assembled Commonwealth Heads of Government issue the Singapore Declaration, setting out the core political values of the Commonwealth. It is considered, along with the 1991 Harare Declaration, one of the two most important documents of the Commonwealth's constitution.
1971	26 March	East Pakistan declares its independence as Bangladesh.
1971	3 December	India intervenes in Bangladesh, sparking the Indo-Pakistani War of 1971.
16 December	Pakistan surrenders to India, ending the Bangladeshi Liberation War.	
1972	18 April	Bangladesh joins the Commonwealth, having gained independence from Pakistan the previous year. Pakistan temporarily withdraws from the Commonwealth in protest at the Commonwealth's recognition of Bangladesh's independence. Pakistan remains outside the Commonwealth until late 1989.
1973	10 July	The Bahamas joins the Commonwealth upon being granted independence by the United Kingdom.
1973	2 August	The second Commonwealth Heads of Government Meeting convenes in Ottawa, Ontario, Canada.
1974	24 January	The 1974 British Commonwealth Games open in Christchurch, New Zealand. It is the last time that the Games' name includes reference to "British".
1974	7 February	Grenada joins the Commonwealth upon being granted independence by the United Kingdom.
1975	29 April	The third Commonwealth Heads of Government Meeting convenes in Kingston, Jamaica.
1975	1 July	Guyana's Sir Shridath Ramphal succeeds Arnold Smith as Commonwealth Secretary-General.
1975	16 September	Papua New Guinea joins the Commonwealth upon being granted independence by Australia.
1976	29 June	Seychelles joins the Commonwealth upon being granted independence by the United Kingdom with Sir James Mancham as the first President of Seychelles.
1977	8 June	The fourth Commonwealth Heads of Government Meeting convenes in London, the United Kingdom.
1978	7 July	The Solomon Islands joins the Commonwealth upon being granted independence by the United Kingdom.
1978	3 August	The 1978 Commonwealth Games open in Edmonton, Alberta, Canada. It is the first time that the Games are held under the current name.
1978	1 October	Tuvalu joins the Commonwealth upon being granted independence by the United Kingdom.
1978	3 November	Dominica joins the Commonwealth upon being granted independence by the United Kingdom.
1979	12 July	Kiribati joins the Commonwealth upon being granted independence by the United Kingdom.
1979	1 August	The fifth Commonwealth Heads of Government Meeting convenes in Lusaka, Zambia.
1979	7 August	At the conclusion of the fifth CHOGM, the assembled Commonwealth Heads of Government issue the Lusaka Declaration, reaffirming the Commonwealth's opposition to racism and demanding legal equality for all people of the Commonwealth.
1979	27 October	Saint Vincent and the Grenadines joins the Commonwealth upon being granted independence by the United Kingdom.
1979	12 December	Zimbabwe Rhodesia dissolves itself, returning power to the United Kingdom (formally as Southern Rhodesia) in preparation for recognised independence as from 18 April 1980.
1979	21 December	The Lancaster House Agreement is reached, setting the terms of independence for Southern Rhodesia as Zimbabwe as from 18 April 1980.

== 1980s ==
Year	Date	Event
1980	1 July	Sir Shridath Ramphal begins his second term as Commonwealth Secretary-General.
1980	1 October	Zimbabwe, formerly Southern Rhodesia and Rhodesia, joins the Commonwealth upon being granted independence by the United Kingdom.
1980	30 July	Vanuatu, formerly the New Hebrides, joins the Commonwealth upon being granted independence from a joint France-United Kingdom condominium.
1981	21 September	Belize joins the Commonwealth upon being granted independence by the United Kingdom.
1981	30 September	The sixth Commonwealth Heads of Government Meeting convenes in Melbourne, Australia.
1981	1 November	Antigua and Barbuda joins the Commonwealth upon being granted independence by the United Kingdom.
1982	30 September	The 1982 Commonwealth Games open in Brisbane, Australia.
1982	9 July	The Maldives joins the Commonwealth as a 'Special Member', having been granted independence by the United Kingdom in 1965.
1983	19 September	Saint Kitts and Nevis joins the Commonwealth upon being granted independence by the United Kingdom.
1983	23 November	The seventh Commonwealth Heads of Government Meeting convenes in New Delhi, India.
1984	1 January	Brunei joins the Commonwealth upon being granted independence by the United Kingdom. Brunei becomes the second absolute monarchy in the Commonwealth with the Sultan of Brunei, Hassanal Bolkiah also as Prime Minister of Brunei.
1985	1 July	Sir Shridath Ramphal begins his third term as Commonwealth Secretary-General. He becomes the first, and (so far) only, Secretary-General to serve three terms.
1985	20 July	The Maldives becomes a full member of the Commonwealth, having joined as a 'Special Member' in 1982.
1985	16 October	The eighth Commonwealth Heads of Government Meeting convenes in Nassau, The Bahamas.
1986	24 July	The 1986 Commonwealth Games open in Edinburgh, the United Kingdom. The Games are boycotted by 32 countries, including almost all African, Caribbean, and Asian nations, to protest against the British government's attitude to sport in apartheid-era South Africa.
1986	3 August	The ninth Commonwealth Heads of Government Meeting convenes in London, the United Kingdom.
1987	13 October	The tenth Commonwealth Heads of Government Meeting convenes in Vancouver, British Columbia, Canada. It is the first meeting held outside the host country's capital city.
1987	15 October	Fiji is declared to have left the Commonwealth of Nations by decision of the assembled Commonwealth Heads of Government Meeting, after two coups d'état, and Sitiveni Rabuka's unilateral declaration of a republic in Fiji.
1989	29 September	Cameroon applies for observer status in the Commonwealth, paving the way for its membership six years later.
1989	1 October	Pakistan returns to its status as a republic in the Commonwealth.
1989	18 October	The 11th Commonwealth Heads of Government Meeting convenes in Kuala Lumpur, Malaysia.
1989	21 October	At the conclusion of the eleventh CHOGM, the assembled Commonwealth Heads of Government issue the Langkawi Declaration, committing Commonwealth members to environmental sustainability.

== 1990s ==
Year	Date	Event
1990	24 January	The 1990 Commonwealth Games open in Auckland, New Zealand.
1990	21 March	Namibia, formerly South West Africa, joins the Commonwealth upon being granted independence by South Africa.
1990	1 July	Nigeria's Chief Emeka Anyaoku succeeds Sir Shridath Ramphal as Commonwealth Secretary-General.
1991	16 October	The 12th Commonwealth Heads of Government Meeting convenes in Harare, Zimbabwe.
1991	20 October	At the conclusion of the twelfth CHOGM, the assembled Commonwealth Heads of Government issue the Harare Declaration, establishing the core principles and values of the Commonwealth, detailing membership criteria, and redefining and reinforcing its purpose. It is considered, along with the 1971 Singapore Declaration, one of the two most important documents of the Commonwealth's constitution.
1993	21 October	The 13th Commonwealth Heads of Government Meeting convenes in Limassol, Cyprus.
1994	1 June	South Africa returns to the Commonwealth, albeit, as a republic in the Commonwealth of Nations. Nelson Mandela became a Commonwealth head of state and head of government
1994	18 August	The 1994 Commonwealth Games open in Victoria, Canada. The event marked South Africa's return to the Commonwealth Games after a 36 years absence and the Colony of Hong Kong's final appearance, as the handover of Hong Kong would take place in 1997.
1995	1 July	Chief Emeka Anyaoku begins his second term as Commonwealth Secretary-General.
1995	10 November	The 14th Commonwealth Heads of Government Meeting convenes in Auckland, New Zealand.
1995	12 November	The assembled Commonwealth Heads of Government agree to the Millbrook Commonwealth Action Programme on the Harare Declaration, designed to implement the Harare Declaration's affirmation of the Commonwealth's principles and membership criteria.
1995	13 November	Cameroon joins the Commonwealth, having been granted independence by France in 1960, and joined by the former British colony of Southern Cameroons in 1961.
1995	13 November	Mozambique joins the Commonwealth. It is the first country to join the Commonwealth without having had any constitutional ties to an existing member state. Mozambique was also the first Lusophone country to join.
1997	1 October	Fiji returns to the Commonwealth, albeit, remaining as a republic, having adopted a new constitution that complies with Commonwealth standards.
1997	24 October	The 15th Commonwealth Heads of Government Meeting convenes in Edinburgh, the United Kingdom.
1997	27 October	At the conclusion of the 15th CHOGM, the assembled Commonwealth Heads of Government issue the Edinburgh Declaration, codifying the Commonwealth's membership criteria.
1998	11 September	The 1998 Commonwealth Games open in Kuala Lumpur, Malaysia. It is the first Games to be held in Asia, and the first to be held outside the so-called 'White Commonwealth' since 1966.
1999	29 May	The Commonwealth Ministerial Action Group lifts Nigeria's suspension from the Commonwealth.
1999	18 October	The Commonwealth Ministerial Action Group suspends Pakistan from the Commonwealth with immediate effect.
1999	12 November	The 16th Commonwealth Heads of Government Meeting convenes in Durban, South Africa. Thabo Mbeki, President of South Africa, becomes the first Commonwealth Chairperson-in-Office.

== 2000s ==
Year	Date	Event
2000	1 April	New Zealand's Don McKinnon succeeds Chief Emeka Anyaoku as Commonwealth Secretary-General.
2000	6 June	The Commonwealth Ministerial Action Group partially suspends Fiji from the Commonwealth with immediate effect, due to the 2000 Fijian coup d'etat by George Speight.
2001	28 September	The Commonwealth Heads of Government Meeting that was due to convene on 6 October is cancelled in the aftermath of the 11 September terrorist attacks on the United States.
2001	6 October	The 17th Commonwealth Heads of Government Meeting was due to convene in Brisbane, Australia.
2001	20 December	The Commonwealth Ministerial Action Group lifts Fiji's suspension from the Commonwealth, but keeps it on the agenda until the Supreme Court rules on the government's constitutionality.
2002	30 January	The Commonwealth Ministerial Action Group approves Pervez Musharraf's roadmap for the October general election.
2002	2 March	The 17th Commonwealth Heads of Government Meeting convenes in Coolum, Australia. John Howard becomes Commonwealth Chairperson-in-Office.
2002	19 March	After Commonwealth election observers report that Zimbabwe's presidential election was rife with fraud and intimidation, the troika, led by John Howard, announces Zimbabwe's immediate suspension from the Commonwealth.
2002	25 July	The 2002 Commonwealth Games open in Manchester, the United Kingdom.
2003	5 December	The 18th Commonwealth Heads of Government Meeting convenes in Abuja, Nigeria. Olusegun Obasanjo, President of Nigeria, becomes Commonwealth Chairperson-in-Office.
2003	5 December	New Zealand's Don McKinnon is re-elected as Commonwealth Secretary-General in a surprise competitive election by forty votes to eleven against Sri Lanka's Lakshman Kadirgamar.
2003	7 December	Robert Mugabe personally announces Zimbabwe's immediate withdrawal from the Commonwealth, in wake of his failure to have his country's suspension lifted.
2003	8 December	At the conclusion of the 18th CHOGM, the assembled Commonwealth Heads of Government issue the Aso Rock Declaration, reaffirming the Commonwealth's commitment to the Harare Declaration.
2004	1 April	Don McKinnon begins his second term as Commonwealth Secretary-General.
2004	22 May	The Commonwealth Ministerial Action Group lifts Pakistan's suspension from the Commonwealth with immediate effect.
2005	7 April	The International Organisations Act 2005 is passed in the United Kingdom, amending the Commonwealth Secretariat Act 1966.
2005	25 November	The 19th Commonwealth Heads of Government Meeting convenes in Valletta, Malta. Lawrence Gonzi becomes Commonwealth Chairperson-in-Office.
2006	15 March	The 2006 Commonwealth Games open in Melbourne, Australia.
2006	8 December	The Commonwealth Ministerial Action Group suspends Fiji from the Commonwealth with immediate effect, due to the 2006 Fijian coup d'etat by Frank Bainimarama.
2007	24 October	The Committee on Commonwealth Membership makes recommendations on changes to the membership criteria of the Commonwealth.
2007	22 November	The Commonwealth Ministerial Action Group suspends Pakistan from the Commonwealth with immediate effect.
2007	23 November	The 20th Commonwealth Heads of Government Meeting convenes in Kampala, Uganda. Yoweri Museveni becomes Commonwealth Chairperson-in-Office. The Republic of Somaliland (formerly British Somaliland) sent a delegation including Dahir Riyale Kahin, President of Somaliland to apply for observer status.
2008	1 April	India's Kamalesh Sharma succeeds Don McKinnon as Commonwealth Secretary-General.
2008	22 May	The Commonwealth Ministerial Action Group lifts Pakistan's suspension from the Commonwealth with immediate effect.
2009	1 September	Fiji's suspension is increased to a full suspension, following a failure by Frank Bainimarama to commit to the restoration of constitutional government by 2010.
2009	27 November	The 21st Commonwealth Heads of Government Meeting convenes in Port of Spain, Trinidad and Tobago. Patrick Manning becomes Commonwealth Chairperson-in-Office. Rwanda is admitted to the Commonwealth as the second member state without any constitutional ties to any other member state.

== 2010s ==
Year	Date	Event
2010	26 May	Kamla Persad-Bissessar becomes Prime Minister of Trinidad and Tobago, and thus succeeds Patrick Manning as Commonwealth Chairperson-in-Office.
2010	October	The 2010 Commonwealth Games are held in Delhi, India. Fiji was banned from competing.
2011	28 October	The 22nd Commonwealth Heads of Government Meeting convenes in Perth, Australia. Julia Gillard becomes Commonwealth Chairperson-in-Office. Meeting leads to Perth Agreement in which amendmented the rules to the royal succession laws, namely, replacing male-preference primogeniture with absolute primogeniture and ending the disqualification of those married to Roman Catholics.
2013	October	The Gambia withdrew from the Commonwealth by decree of Yahya Jammeh.
2013	November	The 23rd Commonwealth Heads of Government Meeting convenes in Colombo, Sri Lanka. Mahinda Rajapaksa becomes Commonwealth Chairperson-in-Office.
2014	July–August	The 2014 Commonwealth Games are held in Glasgow, Scotland
2015	January	Maithripala Sirisena becomes President of Sri Lanka, after the 2 year early 2015 Sri Lankan presidential election and thus succeeds Mahinda Rajapaksa as Commonwealth Chairperson-in-Office.
2015	November	The 24th Commonwealth Heads of Government Meeting convenes in Malta. Joseph Muscat becomes Commonwealth Chairperson-in-Office.
2016	October	The Maldives withdrew from the Commonwealth. This lasts until 1 February 2020, when the Maldives returned to its status as a Commonwealth republic.
2017		The Gambia begins the process of returning to the Commonwealth under the new Gambian Government of President Adama Barrow, who won the 2016 Gambian presidential election with returning The Gambia to its membership of the Commonwealth as part of his campaign promises..
2017		The offer to host the 25th Commonwealth Heads of Government Meeting, originally scheduled to be held in Vanuatu is rescinded, after Cyclone Pam devastated the country's infrastructure in March 2015. 2019 Meeting to be hosted in Malaysia is moved to 2020.
2018	February	The Gambia was returned to its membership of the Commonwealth.
2018	April	The rescheduled 25th Commonwealth Heads of Government Meeting convenes in London, United Kingdom, after Vanuatu's offer to host in 2018 is rescinded due to Cyclone Pam devastated the country's infrastructure in March 2015. Charles, Prince of Wales, is selected as the third Head of the Commonwealth, to take office sometime in the future.
2018	April	The 2018 Commonwealth Games were held in Gold Coast, Queensland, Australia. The Gambia sent a team to compete.
2018	May	Zimbabwe under Emmerson Mnangagwa, President of Zimbabwe applied to rejoin the Commonwealth.

== 2020s ==
Year	Date	Event
2020	1 February	The Maldives returns to the Commonwealth.
2021	30 November	Barbados becomes a republic, but remains in the Commonwealth. Dame Sandra Mason, the former Governor-General of Barbados became the first President of Barbados.
2022	24–25 June	The rescheduled 26th Commonwealth Heads of Government Meeting was held in Kigali, Rwanda. This was the first meeting in a country that was never part of the British Empire.
2022	25 June	Togo and Gabon join the Commonwealth as the third and forth member states without any constitutional ties to any other member states.
2022	July–August	The 2022 Commonwealth Games take place in Birmingham, England, United Kingdom, after the Games were stripped from being hosted by Durban, South Africa.
2022	8 September	Queen Elizabeth II dies, being succeeded by King Charles III. King Charles became the third Head of the Commonwealth as well.
