= Valerie Amos, Baroness Amos =

British diplomat (born 1954)

The Right Honourable The Baroness Amos LG CH PC
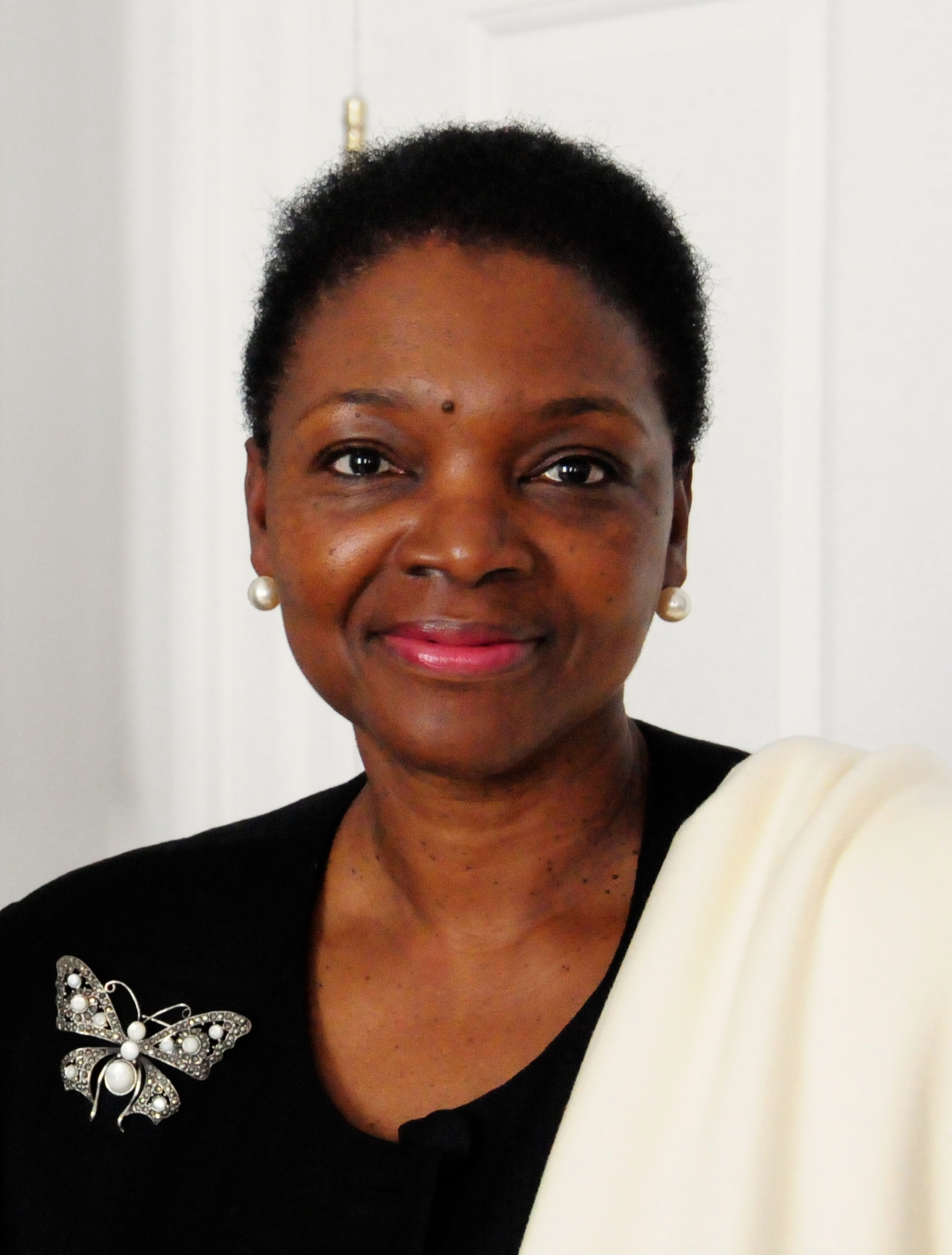
- Official portrait, 2013

United Nations Undersecretary General for Humanitarian Affairs and Emergency Relief Coordinator
- In office 1 September 2010 – 29 May 2015
- Secretary-General: Ban Ki-moon
- Preceded by: John Holmes
- Succeeded by: Stephen O'Brien

British High Commissioner to Australia
- In office 1 October 2009 – 1 September 2010
- Monarch: Elizabeth II
- Prime Minister: Gordon Brown; David Cameron
- Preceded by: Helen Liddell
- Succeeded by: Paul Madden

Leader of the House of Lords Lord President of the Council
- In office 6 October 2003 – 28 June 2007
- Prime Minister: Tony Blair
- Preceded by: The Lord Williams of Mostyn
- Succeeded by: The Baroness Ashton of Upholland

Secretary of State for International Development
- In office 12 May 2003 – 6 October 2003
- Prime Minister: Tony Blair
- Preceded by: Clare Short
- Succeeded by: Hilary Benn

Parliamentary Under-Secretary of State for Foreign and Commonwealth Affairs
- In office 12 June 2001 – 12 May 2003
- Prime Minister: Tony Blair
- Preceded by: The Baroness Scotland of Asthal
- Succeeded by: Chris Mullin

Baroness-in-Waiting Government Whip
- In office 28 July 1998 – 11 June 2001
- Prime Minister: Tony Blair
- Preceded by: The Baroness Gould of Potternewton
- Succeeded by: The Lord Bassam of Brighton

Member of the House of Lords
- Lord Temporal
- Life peerage 24 September 1997

Personal details
- Born: Valerie Ann Amos; 13 March 1954 (age 72) Georgetown, British Guiana (now Guyana)
- Party: Labour
- Education: University of Birmingham; University of Warwick; University of East Anglia

Valerie Ann Amos, Baroness Amos (born 13 March 1954) is a Guyanese-British Labour Party politician and dihplomat who served as the eighth UN Under-Secretary-General for Humanitarian Affairs and Emergency Relief Coordinator. Before her appointment to the UN, she served as British High Commissioner to Australia. She was created a life peer in 1997, serving as Leader of the House of Lords and Lord President of the Council from 2003 to 2007.

When she was appointed Secretary of State for International Development on 12 May 2003, following the resignation of Clare Short, Amos became the first Black, Asian and minority ethnic (BAME) woman to serve as a Cabinet minister. She left the Cabinet when Gordon Brown became Prime Minister. In July 2010, Secretary-General of the United Nations Ban Ki-moon announced Baroness Amos's appointment to the role of Under-Secretary-General for Humanitarian Affairs and Emergency Relief Coordinator. She took up the position on 1 September 2010 and remained in post until 29 May 2015. In September 2015, Amos was appointed Director of SOAS, University of London, becoming the first black woman to lead a university in the United Kingdom.

Since September 2020, Amos has been Master of University College, Oxford, succeeding Sir Ivor Crewe and becoming the first-ever black head of an Oxford college, as well as the first woman to head that college.

== Early life ==
Amos was born in 1954 in British Guiana (now Guyana) in South America and, after moving with her family to the UK in 1963, she attended Bexley Technical High School for Girls (now Townley Grammar School), Bexleyheath, where she was the first black deputy head girl. She completed a degree in Sociology at the University of Warwick (1973–76), an MA in cultural studies at the University of Birmingham (where the department was led by Stuart Hall), and studied education at the University of East Anglia.

== Charity career ==
After working in Equal Opportunities, Training and Management Services in local government in the London boroughs of Lambeth, Camden and Hackney, Amos became Chief Executive of the Equal Opportunities Commission in 1989, leaving the position in 1994.

In 1995, Amos co-founded the consultancy firm Amos Fraser Bernard and was an adviser to the South African government on public service reform, human rights and employment equity.

Amos has also been deputy chair of the Runnymede Trust (1990–1998); a trustee of the Institute for Public Policy Research; a non-executive director of the University College London Hospitals Trust; a trustee of Voluntary Service Overseas; chair of the Afiya Trust; a director of Hampstead Theatre; chair of the Board of Governors of the Royal College of Nursing Institute; and a trustee, now patron, of the Serious Trust. In March 2026, she was announced by Tomorrow's Warriors – a music education and artist development charity founded in 1991 – as one of the organisation's inaugural patrons.

== House of Lords ==
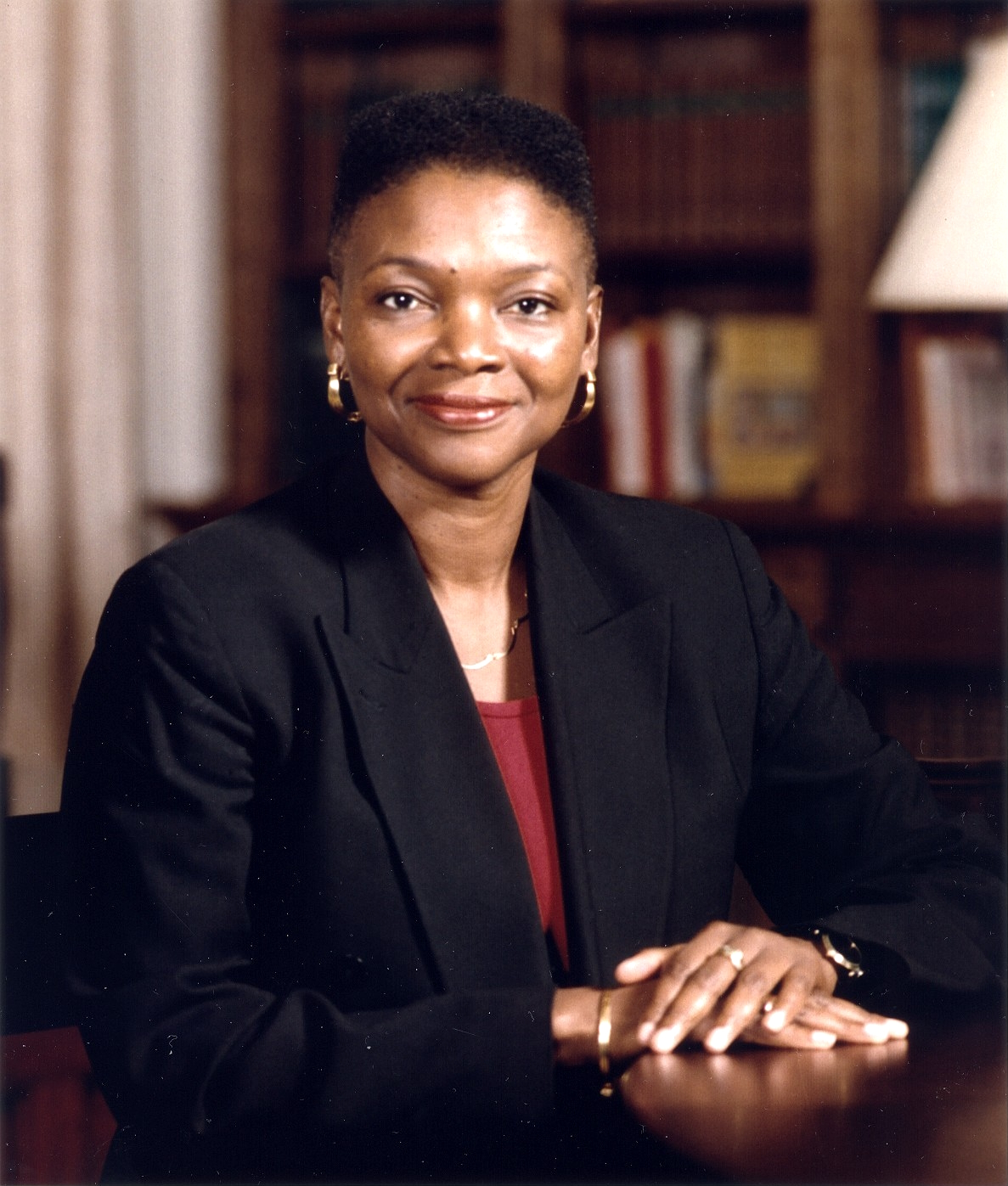
Amos's Official Ministerial Portrait

Amos was elevated to the peerage in August 1997 as Baroness Amos, of Brondesbury in the London Borough of Brent. In the House of Lords, she was a co-opted member of the Select Committee on European Communities Sub-Committee F (Social Affairs, Education and Home Affairs) from 1997 to 1998. From 1998 to 2001, she was a Government Whip in the House of Lords and also a spokesperson on Social Security, International Development and Women's Issues as well as one of the Government's spokespersons in the House of Lords on Foreign and Commonwealth Affairs. Baroness Amos was appointed Parliamentary Under-Secretary for Foreign & Commonwealth Affairs on 11 June 2001, with responsibility for Africa; Commonwealth; Caribbean; Overseas Territories; Consular Issues and FCO Personnel. She was replaced by Chris Mullin.

=== International Development Secretary and Leader of the House of Lords ===
After previously threatening to resign as International Development Secretary in the lead-up to the 2003 invasion of Iraq, Clare Short eventually stood down in May 2003 over a draft UN resolution that she felt failed to give "the UN its promised central role in rebuilding Iraq". Baroness Amos, who had been serving as Foreign Office minister and as a spokesperson in the Lords for International Development was swiftly announced as Short's replacement. Her appointment made her "the UK's first black woman cabinet minister" and was an unusual example of a government department being headed by a member of the House of Lords.

Baroness Amos was appointed Leader of the House of Lords on 6 October 2003, following the death of Lord Williams of Mostyn, which meant that her tenure as Secretary of State for International Development lasted less than six months.

On 17 February 2005, the British Government nominated Lady Amos to head the United Nations Development Programme, but the position was assigned to Kemal Derviş.

== Non-governmental roles ==
Baroness Amos left the cabinet when Gordon Brown took over as prime minister from Tony Blair in June 2007. Brown proposed her as the European Union special representative to the African Union. However, Belgian career diplomat Koen Vervaeke was appointed to this role instead. She was a member of the Committee on Commonwealth Membership, which presented its report on potential changes in membership criteria for the Commonwealth of Nations at the Commonwealth Heads of Government Meeting 2007 in Kampala, Uganda. She was a member of the board of the Sierra Leone Titanium Resources Group.

On 8 October 2008, it was reported that Amos was to join the Football Association's management board for England's bid to host the 2018 World Cup. This was described as a "surprise appointment", since she has no recorded interest in football (despite her interest in cricket) or any experience in similar work such as the 2012 Olympics bid.

In August 2025, Amos was appointed leader of the independent investigation into NHS maternity and neonatal care. The report of the enquiry was published on 30 June 2026. Prior to the report's publication, Dr. Bill Kirkup (known for, among other things, chairing the Morecambe Bay Maternity Enquiry) resigned as he felt he could not support a report that denied that “normal birth” ideology had an impact on care. Other criticism of the investigation report included adverse comment from Michelle Welsh, the government maternity advisor, who said she was "shocked and profoundly disappointed by the report" and from James Titcombe.

On November 1st 2026, the Sunday Times reported claims that an AI programme ignored the evidence given to the review by women who say they were harmed by a drive for births with no medical intervention. More than 10,000 responses had been fed into Microsoft Copilot, with NHS staff asking it to "identity themes and produce summaries"; former Health Secretary Sir Jeremy Hunt called the allegations "deeply troubling".

== British High Commissioner to Australia ==
On 4 July 2009, it was announced that Baroness Amos had been appointed British High Commissioner to Australia in succession to Helen Liddell (now Baroness Liddell). Amos took up her position in October 2009, and was succeeded by Paul Madden, who took up the appointment during January 2011.

== UN Emergency Relief Coordinator ==
In 2010, United Nations Secretary-General Ban Ki-moon announced Amos's appointment as Under-Secretary-General for Humanitarian Affairs and Emergency Relief Coordinator. In March 2012, she visited Syria on behalf of the UN to press the Syrian government to allow access to all parts of Syria to help people affected by the insurgency.

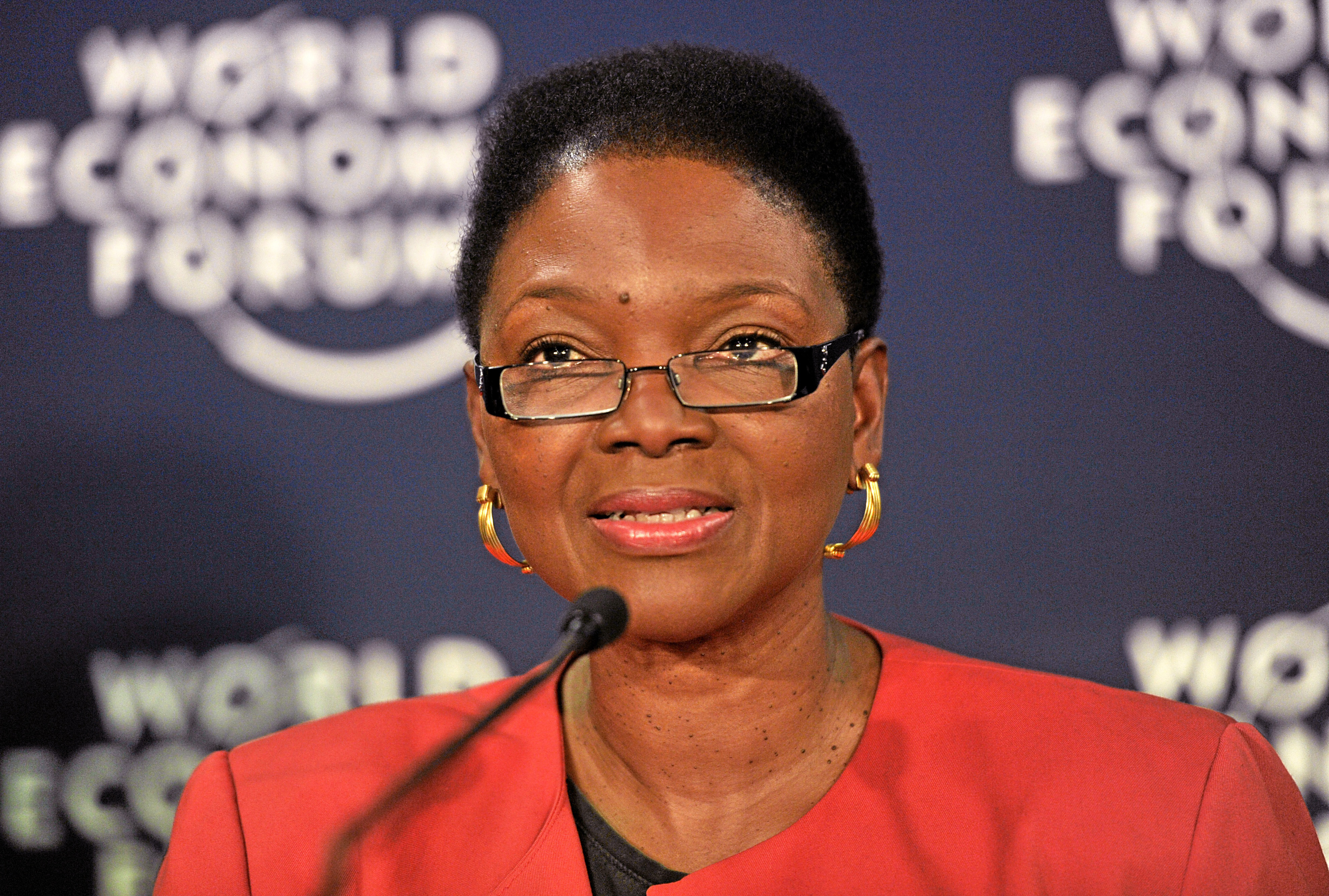
Amos during the WEF 2013

In 2015, World Health Organization (WHO) Director General Margaret Chan appointed Amos as member of the Advisory Group on Reform of WHO's Work in Outbreaks and Emergencies with Health and Humanitarian Consequences. Since 2019, Amos has been serving on the Center for Strategic & International Studies' (CSIS) Task Force on Humanitarian Access, co-chaired by Cory Booker and Todd Young.

== University career ==
In September 2015, she became the ninth director of SOAS University of London, the first woman of African descent to be director of an institute of higher education in Great Britain. In 2019, she co-led a report by Universities (UUK) and the National Union of Students (NUS) addressing the disparity between the proportion of "top degrees" (first or 2:1 degrees) achieved by white and black, Asian and minority ethnic (BAME) students.

In January 2021, Amos left her position at SOAS to become Master of University College, Oxford, as both the first woman appointed to that post and the first black head of any Oxford college.

== Honours ==
Amos was awarded an honorary professorship at Thames Valley University in 1995 in recognition of her work on equality and social justice. On 1 July 2010, she received the honorary degree of Doctor of the University (DUniv) from the University of Stirling in recognition of her "outstanding service to our society and her role as a model of leadership and success for women today." She has also been awarded the honorary degrees of Doctor of Laws (Hon LLD) from the University of Warwick in 2000 and the University of Leicester in 2006.

At the University of Birmingham, where she studied as an undergraduate, the Guild of Students have named one of the committee rooms "The Amos Room" after her, in acknowledgement of her services to society.

In 2012, Amos was awarded an honorary Doctor of Laws degree (Hon LLD) from the University of Nottingham, and in 2013, made an honorary Doctor of Civil Law (Hon DCL) at Durham University.

Amos was appointed a Member of the Order of the Companions of Honour (CH) in the 2016 Birthday Honours for services to the United Nations and emergency relief.

In 2017, Amos was awarded an honorary degree at Middlesex University, thereby "recognising achievement at the highest level as well as dedication to public duty and making a difference to others' lives."

In July 2018, Amos received an honorary Doctor of Laws degree (Hon LLD) from the University of Bristol. In December 2018, she was awarded an honorary Doctorate of Literature (Hon DLitt) by the University of the Witwatersrand.

She was elected to the American Academy of Arts and Sciences as an International Honorary Member in 2019.

On 1 January 2022, the Queen appointed Amos a Lady Companion of the Order of the Garter (LG). Amos's banner of arms was erected at St George's Chapel, Windsor, on 13 June. Amos is the first black "knight or lady companion" member of the order since its foundation (excluding the Emperor of Ethiopia Haile Selassie, who as a foreign monarch was a stranger knight companion of the order).

In November 2022, Amos was awarded an honorary fellowship of the University of London.

In May 2023, Amos took part in the Coronation of Charles III, representing the Order of the Garter.

In July 2023, the University of Sussex awarded Amos an honorary degree, praising her as "the first Black woman to lead a university", and in November of the same year, she was conferred with an Honorary Doctor of Law degree (Hon LLD) from the University of Guyana.

== Personal life ==
Amos is an enthusiast of cricket and talked about her love of the game with Jonathan Agnew on Test Match Special during the lunch break of the first day of the England v. New Zealand test match at Old Trafford in May 2008.

After resigning from the cabinet, Baroness Amos took up a directorship with Travant Capital, a Nigerian private equity fund launched in 2007. In the House of Lords Register of Members Interests, she lists this directorship as remunerated.

Amos was listed as one of "the 50 best-dressed over-50s" by The Guardian in March 2013.

Political offices
Preceded by Clare Short	Secretary of State for International Development; 2003	Succeeded by Hilary Benn
Preceded by Lord Williams of Mostyn	Leader of the House of Lords; 2003–2007	Succeeded by Baroness Ashton of Upholland
Preceded by Lord Williams of Mostyn	Lord President of the Council; 2003–2007	Succeeded by Baroness Ashton of Upholland
Party political offices
Preceded by Lord Williams of Mostyn	Leader of the Labour Party in the House of Lords; 2003–2007	Succeeded by Baroness Ashton of Upholland
Diplomatic posts
Preceded by Helen Liddell	British High Commissioner to Australia; 2009–2010	Succeeded by Paul Madden
Positions in intergovernmental organisations
Preceded by John Holmes ( (United Kingdom) )	Undersecretary General for Humanitarian Affairs and Emergency Relief Coordinator; 2010–2015	Succeeded by Stephen O'Brien ( (United Kingdom) )
Academic offices
Preceded by Paul Webley	Director of SOAS University of London; 2015–2021	Succeeded by Adam Habib
Preceded by Sir Ivor Crewe	Master of University College, Oxford; 2020–present	Incumbent
