= 2009 Commonwealth Heads of Government Meeting =

21st Commonwealth Heads of Government Meeting

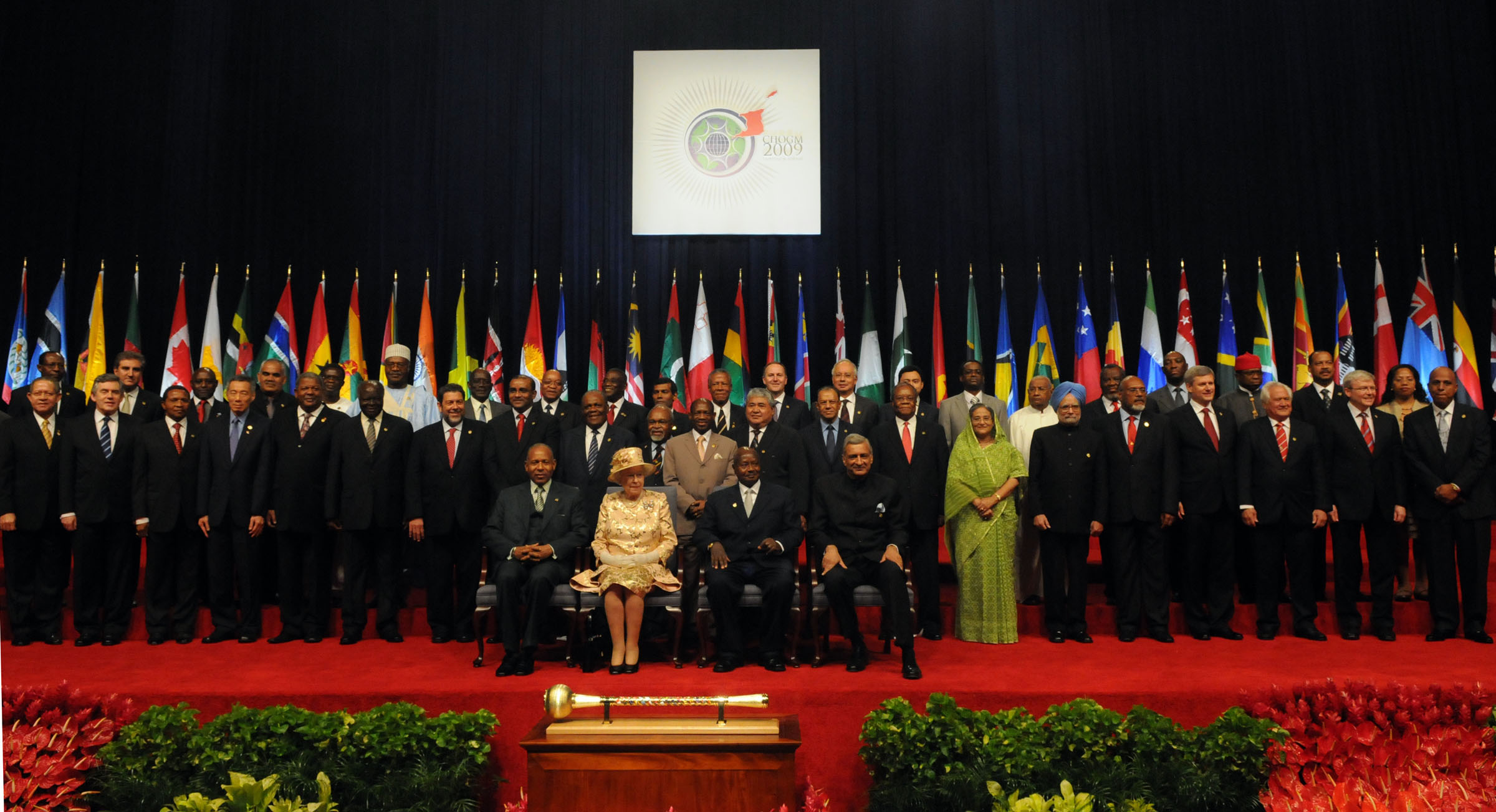
- Host country: Trinidad and Tobago
- Dates: 27–29 November 2009
- Cities: Port of Spain
- Venues: Hyatt Regency and Conference Centre, Port of Spain
- Participants: 49 (of 52 members)
- Heads of State or Government: 34
- Chair: Patrick Manning (Prime Minister)
- Follows: 2007
- Precedes: 2011

Key points
- Global warming Membership criteria Gay rights Sri Lanka

The 2009 Commonwealth Heads of Government Meeting was the 21st meeting of the heads of government of the Commonwealth of Nations. It was held in Port of Spain, Trinidad and Tobago, between 27 and 29 November 2009, and was hosted by Prime Minister Patrick Manning.

The host country of the 2011 meeting was also discussed. It had been slated to be hosted in Colombo, Sri Lanka, but the renewal of the Sri Lankan civil war, and related allegations of human rights abuses, caused some governments, including those of United Kingdom and Canada, to call for a reassessment. This led to the CHOGM being given to Perth, Australia, instead. Sri Lanka was reassigned the CHOGM for CHOGM 2013, and Mauritius was pencilled in as the host of the 2015 CHOGM.

The Commonwealth Ministerial Action Group (CMAG) was reconstituted and strengthened. The Heads of Government agreed to expand the offences that it would be able to investigate to all breaches of the Harare Declaration, rather than just the overthrow of democratic governments.

== Global warming ==
The summit was dominated by the issue of global warming, as it was held just before the United Nations Climate Change Conference in Copenhagen, Denmark. The countries agreed a £6bn-a-year climate change fund to promote low-carbon emission development and adaptation in developing countries, to be funded by developed Commonwealth members and France.

The 2009 summit was attended by the President of France, Nicolas Sarkozy, who was attempting to rally support in the build-up to the Copenhagen summit. It was seen as an indication of reconciliation between France and the Commonwealth, particularly over the issue of Rwanda's prospective membership of the Commonwealth. The meeting was also attended by UN Secretary-General Ban Ki-moon and Danish Prime Minister Lars Løkke Rasmussen.

== Rwanda ==
The 2009 CHOGM was the first opportunity for countries to accede to the Commonwealth after the 2007 CHOGM accepted the report by the Committee on Commonwealth Membership, which established the current membership criteria. After the 2007 CHOGM, the Commonwealth sent a team to Rwanda to examine its eligibility, and recommended it be discussed at the 2009 meeting.

Rwanda was admitted despite the Commonwealth Human Rights Initiative (CHRI) finding that "the state of governance and human rights in Rwanda does not satisfy Commonwealth standards", and that it "does not therefore qualify for admission". CHRI also commented that: "It does not make sense to admit a state that already does not satisfy Commonwealth standards. This would tarnish the reputation of the Commonwealth and confirm the opinion of many people and civic organisations that the leaders of its governments do not really care for democracy and human rights, and that its periodic, solemn declarations are merely hot air."

In Port of Spain, the Heads of Government agreed to accept Rwanda as a member, making it the 54th member, and the second without a direct constitutional tie to an existing member. Several other countries were expected to submit official applications to join, including Algeria, Madagascar, Sudan, and Yemen, but they were not considered.

CHRI, Human Rights Watch, and Freedom House have all found that the protection of democracy and human rights in Rwanda have declined since the country joined the Commonwealth.
