= Edinburgh Declaration =

1987 declaration

The Edinburgh Declaration was a declaration by the heads of government of the Commonwealth of Nations concerning the organisation's membership criteria. Part of the final communiqué issued at the end of the fifteenth Commonwealth Heads of Government Meeting (CHOGM), the Declaration was an endorsement of the report of the Inter-Governmental Group on Criteria for Commonwealth Membership (IGCCM). It was issued on 27 October 1997, in Edinburgh, the United Kingdom.

The report of the IGCCM consolidated all the membership criteria of the organisation, developed over two-thirds of a century, since the Statute of Westminster 1931, into a single document, beginning the process of codification. Primarily, it was decided that the admission of Mozambique, in 1995, was a unique occurrence, in recognition of Mozambique's support for the Commonwealth's policies towards South Africa and Rhodesia during the Apartheid era; any future members would have to have a direct constitutional link with an existing member.

In addition to this new rule, the former rules were consolidated into a single document. These requirements, which remain the same today, are that members must:

- accept and comply with the Harare principles.
- be fully sovereign states.
- recognise the King or Queen as the Head of the Commonwealth.
- accept the English language as the means of Commonwealth communication.
- respect the wishes of the general population vis-à-vis Commonwealth membership.

== Later developments ==
On the advice of Secretary-General Don McKinnon, the 2005 CHOGM, held in Valletta, Malta, decided to re-examine the Edinburgh criteria. The Committee on Commonwealth Membership was made responsible, and reported their findings at the 2007 CHOGM, held in Kampala, Uganda. The committee's recommendations were endorsed by the Heads of Government as reported in the final CHOGM communiqué of 2007 (the Kampala Communiqué), numbered paragraphs 87 through 89.

The new rules re-affirm the centrality of the principles set forth in the Singapore Declaration and subsequent declarations (such as the Harare Declaration), but give additional concrete details on the specific requirements for membership. For example, for an applicant to demonstrably comply with the principle of democracy includes the holding of free and fair elections for legislative representatives, and furthermore good governance must include well-trained public servants and transparent public accounts. Most of the other membership requirements were similar to those stated in past declarations, except the very first requirement, a "constitutional association" with existing members—this was substantially weakened by the committee (by adding the clause "or a substantial relationship with the Commonwealth or a particular group of its members") and was further weakened in the executive CHOGM summary (which instead added an even more general clause "save in exceptional circumstances... should be considered on a case-by-case basis").
