= Republics in the Commonwealth of Nations =

The republics in the Commonwealth of Nations, shown in red

The republics in the Commonwealth of Nations are sovereign state members of the international organisation with a republican form of government. As of June 2022, 36 out of the 56 member states were republics. While King Charles III is the titular Head of the Commonwealth, he is not the head of state of the republican members. The King is, however, the reigning monarch in the Commonwealth realms. The Head of the Commonwealth role does not carry with it substantive power (what power it does have is probably exercisable by the Crown only on advice); instead, it is a symbol of the free association of Commonwealth members.

Except for the former Portuguese possession of Mozambique, the former Belgian trust territory of Rwanda and the former French possessions of Gabon and Togo, they are all former British (or partly British) colonies or self-governing colonies that have evolved into republics. Most of the Commonwealth's members achieved independence while keeping the British monarch as their own individual head of state (in a form of personal union) and later became republics within the Commonwealth when they removed the crown from their government arrangements. In some other instances, such member countries became republics after achieving independence from other former British colonies (as, for example, Bangladesh did from Pakistan in 1971 as a result of the Bangladesh Liberation War).

== History ==
Republics have been permitted as members of the Commonwealth since the London Declaration made on 28 April 1949. Ten days before that declaration, the Republic of Ireland had been declared, ensuring most of Ireland's self-exclusion from the Commonwealth, as republics were not allowed in the Commonwealth at that time (Northern Ireland, as part of the United Kingdom, remained within the Commonwealth). The Republic of Ireland did not re-apply for membership of the Commonwealth, despite being eligible to do so under the London Declaration.

A declaration was made by India in 1950 which allowed it to continue its membership of the Commonwealth despite its decision to adopt a new republican constitution, which removed the King of India from its government. Thus, India became the first republic within the Commonwealth and set a precedent that other countries were able to follow—as long as they each recognised the position of Head of the Commonwealth. The Indian declaration was essentially a compromise between the Indian government and those, such as Jan Smuts, who wished not to allow republics membership:

The Government of India has ... declared and affirmed India's desire to continue her full membership of the Commonwealth of Nations and her acceptance of the King as the symbol of the free association of its independent member nations and as such the Head of the Commonwealth.

Following their independence from the United Kingdom, most Commonwealth countries retained (at least for a time) Queen Elizabeth II as head of state, who was represented in the country by a Governor-General. In each nation, the monarch acquired and adopted a title to indicate the individual sovereignty of each of these nations (such as "Queen of Australia" or "Queen of Belize"). With time, many of these countries became republics, passing constitutional amendments or holding referendums to remove the monarch as their head of state, and replacing the governor-general with an elected or appointed president. This was especially true in post-colonial African nations. Most African realms became republics within a few years of independence. As of 2026, there are 15 sovereign nation states of which Charles III is king: these are known as Commonwealth realms.

Commonwealth republics usually followed the presidential system. Some states became parliamentary republics, such as Malta or Fiji. In Fiji, the change to a republic in 1987 came as a result of two military coups, rather than out of any popular republican sentiment. Even when Fiji was not a member of the Commonwealth, symbols of the monarchy remained, including the Queen's portrait on banknotes and coins; and, unlike in the United Kingdom, the Queen's Official Birthday was a public holiday. When Fiji was readmitted to the Commonwealth, the issue of reinstating the Queen as head of state was raised, but not pursued, although the country's Great Council of Chiefs reaffirmed that the Queen was still the country's "Paramount Chief".

Some republics within the Commonwealth became republics immediately upon gaining independence from the United Kingdom; again, this was particularly true in Africa.

While the moves to both independence and republican status have broken most formal constitutional links to the United Kingdom, a number of Commonwealth countries have retained a right of appeal directly to the Judicial Committee of the Privy Council; for example, Mauritius, and (if the case involves constitutional rights) Kiribati. In contrast with some Commonwealth realms, and British Overseas Territories, however, such appeals are made directly to the Judicial Committee, rather than formally being made to "His Majesty in Council".

== Commonwealth membership ==
Within the Commonwealth, there is no differentiation in status between republics, Commonwealth realms and the members with their own monarchs (Brunei, Eswatini, Lesotho, Malaysia, and Tonga).

Membership of the Commonwealth is by common assent of the existing members, and this principle applies equally to territories gaining independence from the UK and to other territories requesting membership. Until 2007, Commonwealth members that changed their internal constitutional structure to that of a republic had to re-apply for membership. Widespread objection to the racial policies in South Africa resulted in that country deciding not to pursue a re-application for Commonwealth membership when it became a republic in 1961. South Africa was subsequently readmitted as a member of the Commonwealth after democratic elections in 1994. Fiji and the Maldives also did not apply for continued membership after becoming republics (Fiji was likely to be suspended in any case, since a coup had overthrown the democratically elected government), and thus their memberships also lapsed.

=== Current republics in the Commonwealth ===
In some countries that became republics some time after independence, including Malta, Mauritius, and Trinidad and Tobago, the new office of president was a ceremonial post, usually held initially by the last governor-general to provide some continuity during the transition of these nations to become parliamentary republics. In others, such as The Gambia, Ghana, and Malawi, the newly formed presidency was an executive office—powerful in its own right—and thus was first held by the outgoing prime minister. Each of these countries became a type of presidential republic, with abolition of both the monarchy's role as head of state and also the entire Westminster system of parliamentary government. South Africa and Botswana are unique amongst Commonwealth member nations in that, although their presidencies are executive posts, the particular officeholders are nevertheless elected by and accountable to parliament (thus retaining some elements of a system with parliamentary supremacy).

== List of republics ==
=== Republics since independence ===
In each case, the republic was created through a new constitution.

Member state	Year of independence	Year of joining Commonwealth	Type of president	First president	Notes
Cyprus	1960	1961	Executive	New appointment	
Cameroon	1960	1995	Executive	New appointment	Independent from France since 1960
Gabon	1960	2022	Executive	Incumbent Prime Minister	Independent from France since 1960
Togo	1960	2022	Executive	Incumbent Prime Minister	Independent from France since 1960
Samoa	1962	1970	Ceremonial	New appointment	Formerly a League of Nations Mandated Territory and a United Nations Trust Territory administered by New Zealand
Rwanda	1962	2009	Executive	New appointment	Independent from Belgium since 1962
Zambia	1964		Executive	Incumbent Prime Minister	
Maldives	1965	1982	Executive	New appointment	
Singapore	1965	1966	Ceremonial	Incumbent Governor (as a state of Malaysia)	Formerly part of Malaysia from 1963 to 1965, when Singapore was separated from Malaysia. Previously a separate Crown colony of United Kingdom from 1946.
Botswana	1966		Executive	Incumbent Prime Minister	
Nauru	1968	2000	Executive	New appointment	Formerly a League of Nations Mandated Territory and a United Nations Trust Territory administered by Australia, New Zealand, United Kingdom, de facto administered by Australia alone. Became an independent republic in 1968, albeit, with special membership of the Commonwealth of Nations until 2000
Bangladesh	1971	1972	Ceremonial	New appointment	Formerly East Pakistan (1955–1971), previously a part of India as East Bengal. Upon independence it became part of Pakistan as part of the Partition Plan in 1947.
Mozambique	1975	1995	Executive	New appointment	Independent from Portugal since 1975
Seychelles	1976		Executive	New appointment	
Dominica	1978		Ceremonial	Incumbent Governor (interim)	
Kiribati	1979		Executive	Incumbent Chief Minister	
Vanuatu	1980		Ceremonial	New appointment	Formerly the New Hebrides, when it was an Anglo-French condominium (1906–1980) until its accession to independence.
Namibia	1990		Executive	New appointment	Formerly a League of Nations Mandated Territory administered by South Africa. Continued to be de facto administered by South Africa until independence as South West Africa.

=== Other republics in the Commonwealth ===
Member state	Year of independence	Became a Commonwealth republic	Current government type	First president
Barbados	1966	2021	Parliamentary republic	Incumbent Governor-General
Fiji	1970	1987	Parliamentary republic	Incumbent Governor-General
Gambia	1965	1970	Presidential republic	Incumbent Prime Minister
Ghana	1957	1960	Presidential republic	Incumbent Prime Minister
Guyana	1966	1970	Parliamentary republic with an executive presidency	Incumbent Governor-General (interim)
India	1947	1950	Parliamentary republic	New appointment
Kenya	1963	1964	Presidential republic	Incumbent Prime Minister
Malawi	1964	1966	Presidential republic	Incumbent Prime Minister
Malta	1964	1974	Parliamentary republic	Incumbent Governor-General
Mauritius	1968	1992	Parliamentary republic	Incumbent Governor-General (interim)
Nigeria	1960	1963	Presidential republic	Incumbent Governor-General
Pakistan	1947	1956	Parliamentary republic	Incumbent Governor-General
Sierra Leone	1961	1971	Presidential republic	Incumbent Governor-General (interim)
South Africa	1910^{1}	1961	Parliamentary republic with an executive presidency	Incumbent Governor-General
Sri Lanka	1948	1972	Semi-presidential republic	Incumbent Governor-General
Tanzania^{2}	1961	1962	Presidential republic	Incumbent Prime Minister
Trinidad and Tobago	1962	1976	Parliamentary republic	Incumbent Governor-General
Uganda^{3}	1962	1966	Presidential republic	New appointment

1. The Union of South Africa was formed in 1910 as a semi-sovereign nation and associated state, then became fully sovereign in 1931 with the Statute of Westminster.
2. The United Republic of Tanzania was formed in 1964 from the merger of Tanganyika, which had gained independence in 1961 and became a republic in 1962, and Zanzibar, which had gained independence in 1963.
3. In 1963, the Queen was replaced as Uganda's head of state by an indigenous elective monarch with the title President. Uganda's elective monarchy was abolished when it became a republic in 1966.

=== Republics formerly in the Commonwealth ===
Currently, the only former Commonwealth republics are:

- Ireland, also known as the Republic of Ireland, is a republic and a former member of the Commonwealth; however, it does not fit neatly into a category as such. In 1922, as the Irish Free State, it became a dominion in the British Commonwealth. In 1937, the present-day Irish state, officially called Ireland, was established. Its Constitution established it as a de facto republic with little reference to a monarchy but equally no reference to a republic either (see Irish head of state from 1922 to 1949 for further discussion on this ambiguity).
- Zimbabwe, a republic since 18 April 1980, left the Commonwealth in December 2003. In 2018, the government of Emmerson Mnangagwa applied to rejoin the Commonwealth.

== Eligibility of other republics to join the Commonwealth ==
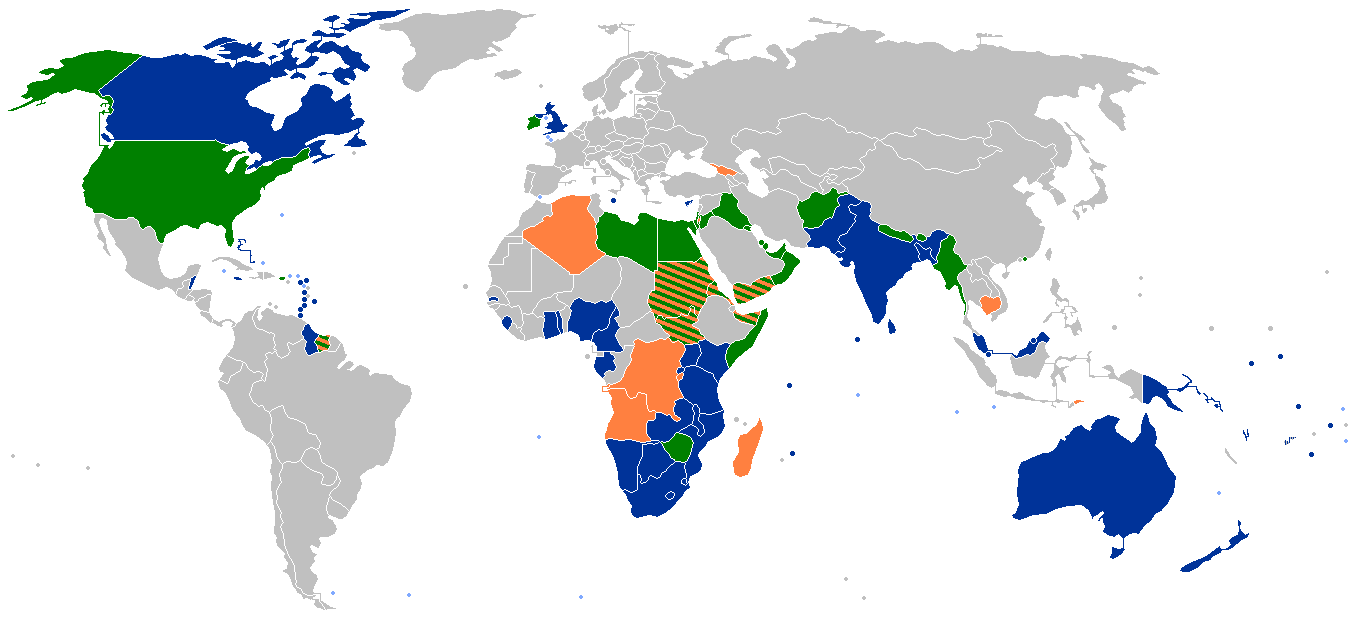
Commonwealth of Nations member states Commonwealth of Nations member state dependencies Applied or interested non-member states, some of them without historic constitutional association Non-member states that were British protectorates, colonies, mandates or under some other type of British administration

The 2007 Kampala review of the Edinburgh Declaration recommended limiting nations eligible for admission to the Commonwealth to those with "a historic constitutional association with an existing Commonwealth member, save in exceptional circumstances". Various republics have a historic association with the United Kingdom as former British-administered territories. The 2009 admission of Rwanda, which has no such association, was made under the "exceptional circumstances" proviso. However, in 2022, Gabon and Togo, which were former French colonies, became new members of the Commonwealth.

The republics of South Sudan, Sudan, and Suriname have formally made applications, while other republics have expressed interest. Also, the application for observer status was submitted by the unrecognised state of Somaliland, whose territory is officially considered as part of Somalia. The United States (Thirteen Colonies and The Floridas), Israel (see Mandate for Palestine), the Republic of Ireland (Irish Free State), and certain Persian Gulf states, as former parts of the British Empire, would be eligible for membership but have shown little or no interest in same.

== See also ==
- List of republics
- Monarchy of Australia
- Monarchy of Canada
- Monarchy of New Zealand
- Monarchy of the United Kingdom
