= Edinburgh Agreement =

Edinburgh Agreement may refer to:

- Edinburgh Agreement (1992), an agreement reached at a European Council meeting in Edinburgh that granted Denmark four exceptions to the Maastricht Treaty
- Edinburgh Agreement (2012), an agreement between the Scottish Government and the UK Government over the terms of the 2014 referendum on Scottish independence

== See also ==
- Edinburgh Declaration, a 1987 declaration by the Commonwealth of Nations regarding its membership criteria
