= MCAP =

MCAP may refer to:

- Mercyhurst Center for Applied Politics
- Millbrook Commonwealth Action Programme, a programme of the Commonwealth of Nations
- Movement for Change and Prosperity, a political party in Montserrat
- MCAP (file format), an open source file format for recording streams of data
