= Suspension from the Commonwealth of Nations =

List of countries that have been suspended

Suspension from the Commonwealth of Nations is the most serious punishment that can be administered to members of the Commonwealth. In the absence of any mechanism by which to expel countries that breach its rules, the Commonwealth Ministerial Action Group (CMAG) may choose to suspend members from the 'Councils of the Commonwealth', which amounts to the suspension of their formal membership of the organisation, although their participation in activities of the Commonwealth Family of organisations is not necessarily affected.

Five countries have ever been suspended from the Commonwealth since the inception of the device in 1987. It was first applied to Fiji during the 1987 Fijian coups d'état which resulted in its democratic institutions being overthrown. Pakistan has been suspended twice, Fiji three times, and Zimbabwe withdrew from the Commonwealth.

== List of suspensions ==
Member	Suspension began	Suspension ended
Fiji (first time)	1987	1 Oct 1997
Nigeria	11 November 1995	29 May 1999
Pakistan (first time)	18 October 1999	22 May 2004
Fiji (second time)	6 June 2000	20 December 2001
Zimbabwe	19 March 2002	7 December 2003 by leaving the Commonwealth
Fiji (third time)	8 December 2006	26 September 2014 (Note: The 2006 suspension applied only to membership on the Councils of the Commonwealth, a full suspension followed on 1 September 2009. This suspension was subsequently extended to include exclusion from all Commonwealth meetings, sporting events and the technical assistance programme (with an exception for assistance in re-establishing democracy). In March 2014 full exclusion was eased permitting Fiji to join in a number of Commonwealth activities, including the 2014 Commonwealth Games in Glasgow.)
Pakistan (second time)	22 November 2007	22 May 2008
Gabon	18 September 2023 (Note: This suspension applied only to membership on the Councils of the Commonwealth. It was given until 20 August 2025 by the Commonwealth Ministerial Action Group for the country to hold new elections before a full suspension of Commonwealth membership would be considered.)	15 July 2025
