= Lusaka Declaration =

The Lusaka Declaration of the Commonwealth on Racism and Racial Prejudice (short: the Lusaka Declaration) was a declaration of the Commonwealth of Nations on the issues of racism and egalitarianism within and between Commonwealth member states. It was agreed and issued on 7 August 1979 in Lusaka, Zambia, at the conclusion of the fifth Commonwealth Heads of Government Meeting (CHOGM).

The declaration followed the 1971 Singapore Declaration, which laid out the first political, social, and economic membership criteria. In that document, three paragraphs were dedicated to egalitarianism of all forms, of which, one was concentrated entirely upon racism. The impending collapse of the breakaway government of Rhodesia (then styled as 'Zimbabwe Rhodesia' under the Internal Settlement) was seen as demanding a restatement of the Commonwealth's principles of racial equality, and so the Lusaka Declaration was made to further expound and clarify the Heads of Governments' position.

The first article of the declaration demanded legal equality 'without any distinction or exclusion based on race, colour, sex, descent, or national or ethnic origin'. It later stated that no degree of respect for separate cultures could justify racial discrimination, and that the 'infamous policy' of Apartheid was an 'affront to humanity', and that it was the duty of the Commonwealth to effect its 'total eradication'. To compensate for the effects of past colonialism and racism, it was agreed that special provisions may be made to achieve social and economic redress,. In addition to demanding respect and equality for indigenous peoples, the Lusaka Declaration also demanded equal respect for immigrant communities.

The declaration was accompanied by the CHOGM's general communiqué, which explicitly iterated these principles with regard to Zimbabwe, and which led to the invitation of Abel Muzorewa to take part in the Lancaster House Conference.
