= 2005 Commonwealth Heads of Government Meeting =

Commonwealth of Nations summit

19th Commonwealth Heads of Government Meeting
- Host country: Malta
- Dates: 25–27 November 2005
- Cities: Valletta
- Venues: Mellieha
- Participants: 52 (of 53 members)
- Heads of State or Government: 38
- Chair: Lawrence Gonzi (Prime Minister)
- Follows: 2003
- Precedes: 2007

Key points
- Free trade Membership criteria Migration; Pakistan

The 2005 Commonwealth Heads of Government Meeting was the 19th Meeting of the Heads of Government of the Commonwealth of Nations. It was held in Valletta, Malta, between 25 and 27 November 2005, and hosted by Prime Minister Lawrence Gonzi.

Malta is the smallest country to have hosted a CHOGM, committing the country to a major undertaking. Nonetheless, the event passed smoothly, marked by the visit of both Queen Elizabeth II, Head of the Commonwealth, and the British aircraft carrier HMS Illustrious.

== Commonwealth Ministerial Action Group ==
The Commonwealth Ministerial Action Group (CMAG) put much emphasis on the position held by Pakistani President Pervez Musharraf, and overcame opposition from Pakistan to declare that his holding the two positions of President and Chief of Army Staff were "incompatible with the basic principles of democracy and the spirit of the Harare Commonwealth principles" and that "until the two offices are separated, the process of democratization will not be irreversible".

Of note to commentators and the media was the non-discussion of Uganda, where opposition leader Kizza Besigye was arrested days before the CHOGM, and two months before the country's first multiparty elections since Yoweri Museveni took power in 1986. Uganda's capital, Kampala, had been arranged to host the 2007 CHOGM, and the Commonwealth leaders were keenly aware that to hold the CHOGM in a country that was deemed undemocratic would reflect badly on the Commonwealth Secretariat and undermine the Commonwealth's commitment to human rights and good governance.

CMAG membership rotated once again, with Malaysia, Papua New Guinea, Saint Lucia, and the United Kingdom joining it, as the Bahamas, India, Samoa, and Nigeria left.

== Attendees ==
Country	Representative	Position
Commonwealth of Nations	Elizabeth II	Head of the Commonwealth
Commonwealth of Nations	Don McKinnon	Commonwealth Secretary-General
Antigua and Barbuda	Baldwin Spencer	Prime Minister
Australia	John Howard	Prime Minister
Bahamas	Perry Christie	Prime Minister
Bangladesh	Morshed Khan	Minister of Foreign Affairs
Barbados	Owen Arthur	Prime Minister
Belize	Said Musa	Prime Minister
Botswana	Ian Khama	Vice President
Brunei	Prince Mohamed Bolkiah	Minister of Foreign Affairs
Cameroon	Ephraïm Inoni	Prime Minister
Canada	Dan Hays	Speaker of the Senate
Cyprus	Tassos Papadopoulos	President
Dominica	Roosevelt Skerrit	Prime Minister
Fiji	Kaliopate Tavola	Minister of Foreign Affairs
Gambia	Lamin Kaba Bajo	Secretary of State for Foreign Affairs
Ghana	John Kufuor	President
Grenada	Keith Mitchell	Prime Minister
Guyana	Bharrat Jagdeo	President
India	Kamal Nath	Minister of Commerce and Industry
Jamaica	P. J. Patterson	Prime Minister
Kenya	Chirau Ali Mwakwere	Minister of Foreign Affairs
Kiribati	Martin Puta Tofinga	Minister of Commerce, Industry, and Cooperatives
Lesotho	Lesao Lehohla	Deputy Prime Minister
Malawi	Bingu wa Mutharika	President
Malaysia	Abdullah Ahmad Badawi	Prime Minister
Maldives	Maumoon Abdul Gayoom	President
Malta	Lawrence Gonzi (Chair)	Prime Minister
Mauritius	Navin Ramgoolam	Prime Minister
Mozambique	Armando Guebuza	President
Namibia	Hifikepunye Pohamba	President
Nauru	No representative	
New Zealand	Helen Clark	Prime Minister
Nigeria	Olusegun Obasanjo	President
Pakistan	Shaukat Aziz	Prime Minister
Papua New Guinea	Michael Somare	Prime Minister
Saint Kitts and Nevis	Denzil Douglas	Prime Minister
Saint Lucia	Kenny Anthony	Prime Minister
Saint Vincent and the Grenadines	Cenio Lewis	High Commissioner to the United Kingdom
Samoa	Tuilaʻepa Saʻilele Malielegaoi	Prime Minister
Seychelles	James Michel	President
Sierra Leone	Ahmad Tejan Kabbah	President
Singapore	Lee Hsien Loong	Prime Minister
Solomon Islands	Snyder Rini	Deputy Prime Minister
South Africa	Thabo Mbeki	President
Sri Lanka	Kshenuka Seneviratne	High Commissioner to the United Kingdom
Eswatini	Themba Dlamini	Prime Minister
Tanzania	Benjamin Mkapa	President
Tonga	Prince ʻAho‘eitu ʻUnuakiʻotonga Tukuʻaho	Prime Minister
Trinidad and Tobago	Patrick Manning	Prime Minister
Tuvalu	Filoimea Telito	Governor-General
Uganda	Yoweri Museveni	President
United Kingdom	Tony Blair	Prime Minister
Vanuatu	Sato Kilman	Deputy Prime Minister
Zambia	Levy Mwanawasa	President
