= Committee on Commonwealth Membership =

The Committee on Commonwealth Membership (CCM) was a committee convened by the Commonwealth Secretariat in 2006 to examine and report on prospective changes to the membership criteria of the Commonwealth of Nations. It was chaired by P. J. Patterson, formerly Prime Minister of Jamaica, and consisted of seven other members.

The committee met twice, both times in London: on 6-7 December 2006 and 14 May 2007. It issued its report on 24 October 2007, and presented it to the Commonwealth Heads of Government Meeting 2007, in Kampala, Uganda.

== Composition ==
- P. J. Patterson (Jamaica)
- Guido de Marco (Malta)
- Rebecca Kadaga (Uganda)
- Baroness Valerie Amos (United Kingdom)
- Cheryl Carolus (South Africa)
- Yashwant Sinha (India)
- Tuiloma Neroni Slade (Samoa)
- Olivia MacAngus (Canada)

The committee was also attended by the Commonwealth Secretary-General Don McKinnon, Commonwealth Deputy Secretary-General Florence Mugasha, and Head of the Political Affairs Division, Matthew Neuhaus.

== Recommendations ==
The Committee's reported to the 2007 CHOGM in the name of all the members, without dissenting opinion. It was drafted by W. David McIntyre, who also served as a consultant to the Committee. The report supported the prevailing and existing requirements as established by the Edinburgh Declaration. It dictated that the core criteria for membership should be that countries:

- 'As a general rule', have historic constitutional connections with an existing member, or a 'substantial' relationship with the Commonwealth as an institution or a particular group of members.
- Accept the Singapore Declaration of Commonwealth principles.
- Demonstrate commitment to democracy, the rule of law, good governance, and protecting human rights and equality of opportunity.
- Use English as the language of Commonwealth relations.
- Recognise Queen Elizabeth II as Head of the Commonwealth.

The Committee also recommended that new members be 'encouraged' to join the Commonwealth Foundation and engage in the Commonwealth Family, but that they would not be required to do so.
