= Lesao Lehohla =

Mosotho politician

Archibald Lesao Lehohla (born 28 July 1946) is a former Deputy Prime Minister and Minister of Home Affairs and Public Safety of Lesotho.

== Early life and education ==
Lehohla was born on 28 July 1946 in Mafeteng. In 1970, Lehohla obtained a Bachelor of Science from the University of Botswana, Lesotho and Swaziland (UBLS). In 1975, he received a scholarship from UNESCO to attend Oxford University for mathematics. While at Oxford, Lehohla graduated with a Bachelor and Master of Arts.

== Career ==
While attending the UBLS, Lehohla was a teaching assistant from 1970 to 1972. Lehohla started teaching at Bereng High School in 1975 and was promoted to headmaster in 1977. Lehohla remained as headmaster until 1993.

== Politics ==
Lehohla was first elected to parliament from the Mafeteng Constituency in 1993 and became Minister of Home Affairs in the new Basutoland Congress Party government. Subsequently he became Minister of Transport, Posts and Telecommunications in 1995. In May 1996 he became Minister of Education. He won a court ruling enabling him to stand in Mafeteng Constituency again in the 1998 election after his party, the Lesotho Congress for Democracy (LCD), had nominated another candidate, and was re-elected.

=== Deputy Prime Minister ===
On 27 January 2002, Lehohla was elected as the leader for the Lesotho Congress for Democracy party. This position as party leader led him to acquire the position of Deputy Prime Minister later in the 2002 Parliamentary Elections. Lehohla was later removed from his position as Minister of Education and instead made Minister of Home Affairs and Public Safety in November 2004.
