= 2007 Commonwealth Heads of Government Meeting =

20th Commonwealth Heads of Government Meeting
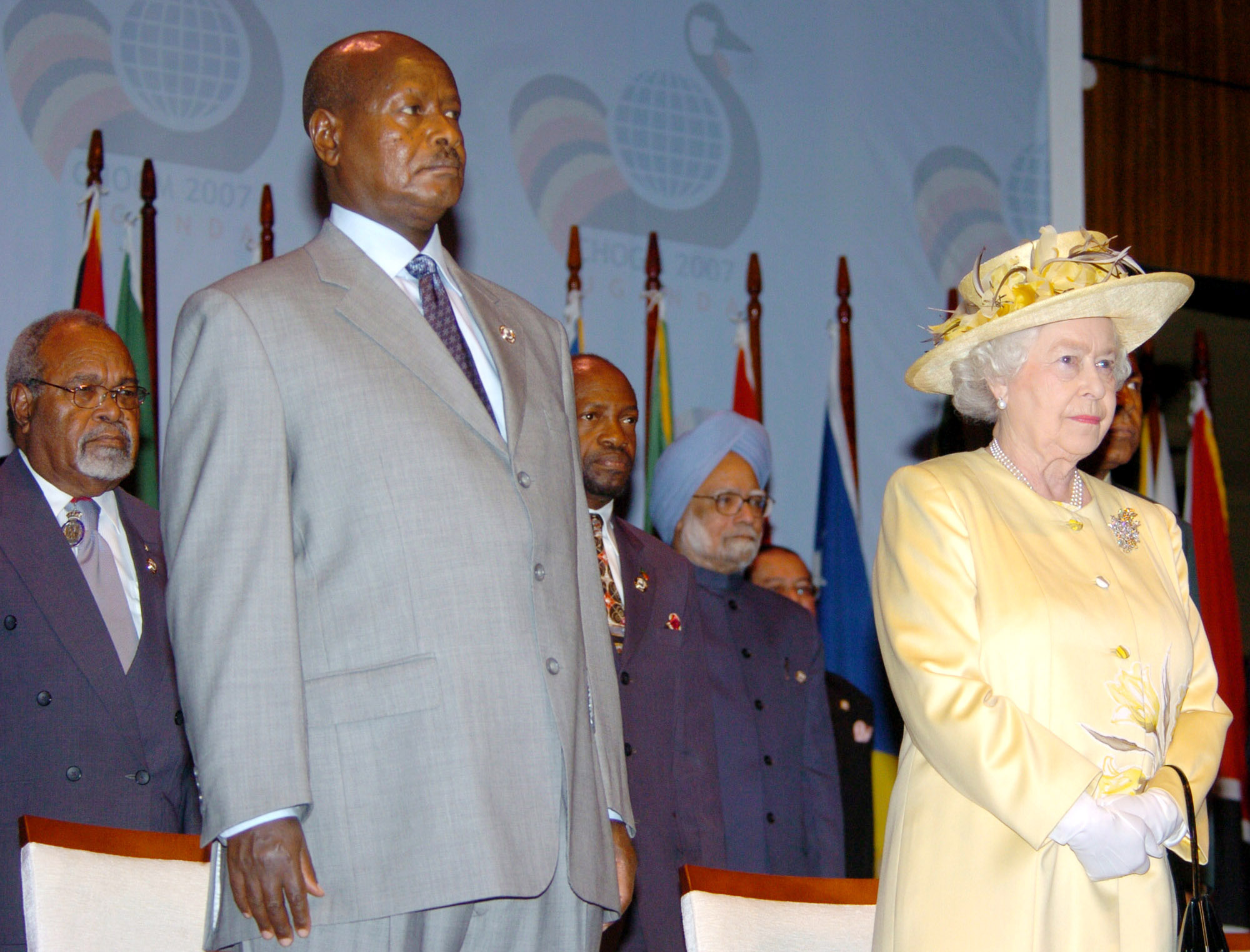
- Host country: Uganda
- Dates: 23–25 November 2007
- Cities: Kampala
- Venues: Munyonyo
- Participants: 48 (of 53 members)
- Heads of State or Government: 36
- Chair: Yoweri Museveni (President)
- Follows: 2005
- Precedes: 2009

Key points
- Debt relief Global warming Membership criteria Pakistan; Secretary-General

The 2007 Commonwealth Heads of Government Meeting was the 20th Meeting of the Heads of Government of the Commonwealth of Nations. It was held in Kampala, Uganda, between 23 November and 25 November 2007, and was hosted by President Yoweri Museveni.

The meeting was attended by representatives of forty-eight countries out of the Commonwealth's fifty-three members (suspended members Fiji and Pakistan, and special member Nauru were not invited, whilst Saint Lucia and Vanuatu sent no representatives). Thirty-six were represented by their Head of State or Head of Government.

== Membership criteria ==
Kampala saw the completion of a review of the Commonwealth's membership criteria, launched at the 2005 CHOGM in Valletta, with the publication of the report of the Committee on Commonwealth Membership. It had already been announced that no new members would be admitted until the 2009 CHOGM. In this context, Rwanda was discussed at great lengths, with Rwanda's President, Paul Kagame, invited to Kampala as neighbour Uganda's guest.

The Commonwealth Ministerial Action Group (CMAG) reimposed the suspension on Pakistan that had been lifted in 2005 on the eve of the CHOGM. Opposed vehemently by Sri Lanka, the move seemed to indicate a more assertive role for CMAG since the premature lifting of the suspension on Pakistan two years earlier. Since Pakistan's suspension and Zimbabwe's withdrawal, CMAG had seen little use, and the more commanding chairmanship of Malta's Michael Frendo marked a change in tone. The new CMAG, elected at the CHOGM, saw Canada, Lesotho, and Tanzania replaced by Namibia, New Zealand, and Uganda.

== Secretary-General ==
At the CHOGM, a new Commonwealth Secretary-General had to be elected, to replace New Zealander Don McKinnon, who had been Secretary-General since 2000. The two contenders were Kamalesh Sharma of India and Michael Frendo. With Frendo having suspended Pakistan, it seemed as though the India-Pakistan rivalry would come to the fore once again. However, Frendo withdrew his candidacy before the vote, leaving Sharma to be appointed unanimously and become the first Asian Secretary-General: leaving Europe as the only continent having not held the position.

The CHOGM was also marked by the appearance of the Prince of Wales and the Duchess of Cornwall. Whilst he took no role in official proceedings, his attendance marked the Prince's first involvement in CHOGMs, having previously distanced himself from Commonwealth affairs. This sparked rumours that Charles was actively courting Commonwealth leaders in anticipation of the choice of successor to Elizabeth II as Head of the Commonwealth (a position that is vested in the Queen personally, and does not pass automatically with the British crown).

== Somaliland delegation ==
A delegation from Somaliland led by Dahir Riyale Kahin, the then President of Somaliland was in attendance at this meeting.
