= Millbrook Commonwealth Action Programme =

The Millbrook Commonwealth Action Programme on the Harare Declaration, sometimes abbreviated to just Millbrook, is a policy programme of the Commonwealth of Nations, designed to implement and uphold the Harare Declaration, which sets out the basic political membership criteria of the Commonwealth. The programme was agreed and announced on 12 November 1995 at Millbrook Resort, near Queenstown, New Zealand, at the conclusion of the fourteenth Commonwealth Heads of Government Meeting.

Millbrook introduces compulsory adherence to the Harare principles, and, in enforcing them, includes aspects of both carrot and stick approaches. The programme encourages the membership to empower the Commonwealth Secretariat to provide incentives for upholding the core political values of the Harare Declaration: democracy, rule of law, and good governance. However, the programme also allows the Secretariat to employ bilateral and multilateral punishments against intransigent members. For serious or persistent offending countries, suspension and expulsion from the Commonwealth altogether are permitted. The programme cites an unconstitutional coup d'état against a democratically elected government as a particularly serious violation.

To help monitor and enforce adherence to the Harare Declaration, Millbrook established the Commonwealth Ministerial Action Group (CMAG), which has the responsibility to examine cases of potential breaches and to recommend appropriate action to be taken by the Secretariat. Convened by the Secretary-General and consisting of Foreign Minister (or equivalent) of eight members, the composition, terms of reference, and operative functions of CMAG are reviewed every two years under the programme.
