= Singapore Declaration =

1971 agreement on the Commonwealth of Nations' shared political values

The Singapore Declaration of Commonwealth Principles was a landmark declaration issued by the assembled Heads of Government of the Commonwealth of Nations, setting out the core political volunteering values that would form the main part of the Commonwealth's membership criteria. The Declaration was issued in Singapore on 22 January 1971 at the conclusion of the first Commonwealth Heads of Government Meeting (CHOGM). Along with the Harare Declaration, issued in 1991, it is considered one of the two most important documents to the Commonwealth's uncodified constitution, until the adoption of the Charter of the Commonwealth in 2012.

The declaration opens with a description of the Commonwealth's identity, the relationship between the organisation and its members, and its fundamental goals:

The Commonwealth of Nations is a voluntary association of independent sovereign states, each responsible for its own policies, consulting and co-operating in the common interests of their peoples and in the promotion of international understanding and world peace.

The second article describes the extent and diversity of the Commonwealth, encompassing both rich nations and poor across six continents and five oceans. The third article states, at the height of the Cold War, that membership of the Commonwealth is compatible with membership of any other international organisation or non-alignment.

The next ten articles in turn detail some of the core political principles of the Commonwealth. These include (in the order in which they are mentioned): world peace and support for the United Nations; individual liberty and egalitarianism; the eradication of poverty, ignorance, disease, and economic inequality; free trade; institutional co-operation; multilateralism; and the rejection of international coercion.

These are summed up in the final article, which serves as a touchstone for Commonwealth principles:

These relationships we intend to foster and extend, for we believe that our multi-national association can expand human understanding and understanding among nations, assist in the elimination of discrimination based on differences of race, colour or creed, maintain and strengthen personal liberty, contribute to the enrichment of life for all, and provide a powerful influence for peace among nations.

The part of the declaration considered the most troubling was the last to be mentioned: 'rejecting coercion as an instrument of policy'. The implication is that not even the Commonwealth itself has any right to enforce its other core values, as that would be using coercion. This apparent conflict was resolved by the Harare Declaration and the Millbrook Commonwealth Action Programme, which clearly mandates the Commonwealth to concern itself with its members' internal situations.
