= Commonwealth of Nations membership criteria =

Rules for joining the political association of mostly former British colonies

The Commonwealth of Nations currently has 56 member states. Member States Former Member States Crown Dependencies and British Overseas Territories

The criteria for membership in the Commonwealth of Nations, which apply to current and prospective member states, have been altered by a series of documents issued over the past eighty-two years.

The most important of these documents were the Statute of Westminster (1931), the London Declaration (1949), the Singapore Declaration (1971), the Harare Declaration (1991), the Millbrook Commonwealth Action Programme (1995), the Edinburgh Declaration (1997), and the Kampala Communiqué (2007). New member states of the Commonwealth must abide by certain criteria that arose from these documents, the most important of which are the Harare principles and the Edinburgh criteria.

The Harare principles require all member states of the Commonwealth, old and new, to abide by certain political principles, including democracy and respect for human rights. These can be enforced upon current members, who may be suspended or expelled for failure to abide by them. To date, Fiji, Nigeria, Pakistan, and Zimbabwe have been suspended on these grounds; Zimbabwe later withdrew.

The foremost of the Edinburgh criteria requires new member states to have either constitutional or administrative ties to at least one current member state of the Commonwealth of Nations. Traditionally, new Commonwealth member states had ties to the United Kingdom. The Edinburgh criteria arose from the 1995 accession of Mozambique, at the time the only member state that was never part of the British Empire (in whole or part). The Edinburgh criteria have been reviewed, and were revised at the 2007 Commonwealth Heads of Government Meeting, allowing the admission of Rwanda at the 2009 Meeting.

== History ==
=== Founding documents ===
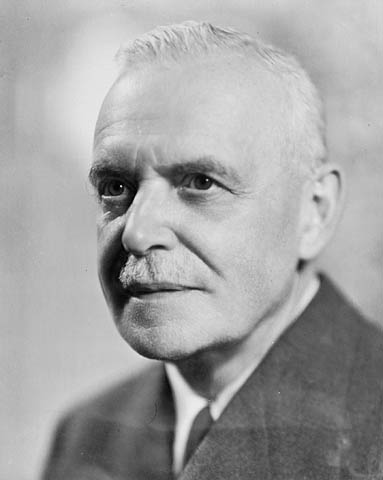
Louis St. Laurent, the author of the London Declaration formula that laid out embryonic membership criteria.

The formation of the Commonwealth of Nations is dated back to the Statute of Westminster, an Act of the British Parliament passed on 11 December 1931. The Statute established the independence of the Dominions, creating a group of equal members where, previously, there was one (the United Kingdom) paramount. The solitary condition of membership of the embryonic Commonwealth was that a state be a Dominion. Thus, the independence of Pakistan (1947), India (1947), and the Dominion of Ceylon (now Sri Lanka) (1948) saw the three countries join the Commonwealth as independent states that retained the King as head of state. On the other hand, Burma (1948) and Israel (1948) did not join the Commonwealth, as they chose to become republics. In 1949, the Commonwealth chose to regard Ireland as no longer being a member when Ireland repealed the External Relations Act under which the King had played a role in its diplomatic relations with other states, although the Irish government's view was that Ireland had not been a member for some years.

With India on the verge of promulgating a republican constitution, the 1949 Commonwealth Prime Ministers Conference was dominated by the impending departure of over half of the Commonwealth's population. To avoid such a fate, Canadian Prime Minister Louis St. Laurent proposed that republics be allowed to remain in the Commonwealth, provided that they recognise King George VI as 'Head of the Commonwealth'. Known as the London Declaration, this agreement thus established the only formalised rule as being that members must recognise the Head of the Commonwealth. The arrangement prompted suggestions that other countries, such as France, Israel, and Norway, join. However, until Western Samoa joined in 1970, only recently independent countries would accede.

=== Singapore Declaration ===
The first statement of the political values of the Commonwealth of Nations was issued at the 1961 conference, at which the members declared that racial equality would be one of the cornerstones of the new Commonwealth, at a time when the organisation's ranks were being swelled by new African and Caribbean members. The immediate result of this was the withdrawal of South Africa's re-application, which it was required to lodge before becoming a republic, as its government's apartheid policies clearly contradicted the principle.

Further political values and principles of the Commonwealth were affirmed in Singapore on 22 January 1971, at the first Commonwealth Heads of Government Meeting (CHOGM). The fourteen points clarified the political freedom of its members, and dictated the core principles of the Commonwealth: world peace, liberty, human rights, equality, and free trade. However, neither the terms nor the spirit of the Declaration were binding, and several openly flouted it; despite little conformity, only Fiji was ever expelled for breaching these tenets (on 15 October 1987, following the second coup of that year).

=== Harare Declaration ===
The Harare Declaration, issued on 20 October 1991 in Harare, Zimbabwe, reaffirmed the principles laid out in Singapore, particularly in the light of the ongoing dismantling of apartheid in South Africa. The Declaration put emphasis on human rights and democracy by detailing these principles once more:

- We believe that international peace and order, global economic development and the rule of international law are essential to the security and prosperity of mankind;
- We believe in the liberty of the individual under the law, in equal rights for all citizens regardless of gender, race, colour, creed or political belief, and in the individual's inalienable right to participate by means of free and democratic political processes in framing the society in which he or she lives;
- We recognise racial prejudice and intolerance as a dangerous sickness and a threat to healthy development, and racial discrimination as an unmitigated evil;
- We oppose all forms of racial oppression, and we are committed to the principles of human dignity and equality;
- We recognise the importance and urgency of economic and social development to satisfy the basic needs and aspirations of the vast majority of the peoples of the world, and seek the progressive removal of the wide disparities in living standards amongst our members.

In 2002, Zimbabwe was suspended for breaching the Harare Declaration. Subsequently, when the Commonwealth refused to lift the suspension, Zimbabwe withdrew from the Commonwealth in 2003.

=== Millbrook Programme ===
The Millbrook Commonwealth Action Programme, issued on 12 November 1995 at the Millbrook Resort, near Queenstown, New Zealand, clarified the Commonwealth's position on the Harare Declaration. The document introduced compulsion upon its members, with strict guidelines to be followed in the event of breaching its rules. These included but were not limited to expulsion from the Commonwealth. Adjudication was left to the newly created Commonwealth Ministerial Action Group (CMAG).

At the same CHOGM, the Programme was enforced for the first time, as Nigeria was suspended. On 19 December 1995, the CMAG found that the suspension was in line with the Programme, and also declared its intent on enforcing the Programme in other cases (particularly Sierra Leone and The Gambia). On 29 May 1999, the day after the inauguration of Nigeria's first democratically elected President since the end of military rule, Olusẹgun Ọbasanjọ, the country's suspension was lifted, on the advice of the CMAG.

=== Edinburgh criteria ===
In 1995, Mozambique, formerly a Portuguese colony, joined the Commonwealth, becoming the first member state to have never had a constitutional link with the United Kingdom. Concerns that this would allow open-ended expansion of the Commonwealth and dilute its historic ties prompted the 1995 CHOGM to launch the Inter-Governmental Group on Criteria for Commonwealth Membership, to report at the 1997 CHOGM, to be held in Edinburgh, Scotland. The group decided that, in future, new member states would be limited to those with constitutional association with an existing Commonwealth member state.

In addition to this new rule, the former rules were consolidated into a single document. They had been prepared for the High Level Appraisal Group set up at the 1989 CHOGM, but not publicly announced until 1997. These requirements, which remain the same today, are that members must:

- accept and comply with the Harare principles.
- be fully independent sovereign states.
- accept the English language as the means of Commonwealth communication.
- respect the wishes of the general population vis-à-vis Commonwealth membership.

=== Kampala review ===
On the advice of Secretary-General Don McKinnon, the 2005 CHOGM, held in Valletta, Malta, decided to re-examine the Edinburgh criteria. The Committee on Commonwealth Membership reported at the 2007 CHOGM, held in Kampala, Uganda. According to Don McKinnon, the members of the Commonwealth decided in principle to expand the membership of the organisation to include countries without linkages to the Commonwealth, but Eduardo del Buey stated that it would still take some time until the criteria are reformed. Outstanding applications as of the 2007 meeting included former Belgian colony Rwanda (application submitted in 2003 and approved in 2009), the former French colonies of Algeria and Madagascar, and the former British colony of Yemen and condominium of Sudan.

The revised requirements stated that:

- (a) an applicant country should, as a general rule, have had a historic constitutional association with an existing Commonwealth member state, save in exceptional circumstances;
- (b) in exceptional circumstances, applications should be considered on a case-by-case basis;
- (c) an applicant country should accept and comply with Commonwealth fundamental values, principles, and priorities as set out in the 1971 Declaration of Commonwealth Principles and contained in other subsequent Declarations;
- (d) an applicant country must demonstrate commitment to: democracy and democratic processes, including free and fair elections and representative legislatures; the rule of law and independence of the judiciary; good governance, including a well-trained public service and transparent public accounts; and protection of human rights, freedom of expression, and equality of opportunity;
- (e) an applicant country should accept Commonwealth norms and conventions, such as the use of the English language as the medium of inter-Commonwealth relations, and acknowledge Queen Elizabeth II (Note: As of 2026, this would now be King Charles III.) as the Head of the Commonwealth; and
- (f) new member states should be encouraged to join the Commonwealth Foundation, and to promote vigorous civil society and business organisations within their countries, and to foster participatory democracy through regular civil society consultations

Rwanda became the 54th nation to join the Commonwealth at the 2009 CHOGM. It became the second country (after Mozambique) not to have any historical ties with the United Kingdom. Rwanda had been a colony of Germany in the 19th century and later of Belgium for the first half of the 20th century. Later ties with France were severed during the 1994 Rwandan genocide. President Paul Kagame also accused it of supporting the killings and expelled a number of French organisations from the country. Since the end of the genocide, English has increased in use. Prime Minister of Malaysia Najib Razak stated that Rwanda's application "was boosted by its commitment towards democracy as well as the values espoused by the Commonwealth". Consideration for its admission was also seen as an "exceptional circumstance" by the Commonwealth Secretariat.

Rwanda was admitted despite the Commonwealth Human Rights Initiative (CHRI) finding that "the state of governance and human rights in Rwanda does not satisfy Commonwealth standards”, and that it “does not therefore qualify for admission". CHRI also commented that: "It does not make sense to admit a state that already does not satisfy Commonwealth standards. This would tarnish the reputation of the Commonwealth and confirm the opinion of many people and civic organisations that the leaders of its governments do not really care for democracy and human rights, and that its periodic, solemn declarations are merely hot air."

Both CHRI and Human Rights Watch have found that respect for democracy and human rights in Rwanda has declined since the country joined the Commonwealth.
