= Commonwealth Ministerial Action Group =

Group within the Commonwealth of Nations

The Commonwealth Ministerial Action Group on the Harare Declaration, abbreviated to CMAG, is a group of representatives of members of the Commonwealth of Nations that is responsible for upholding the Harare Declaration. That Declaration dictates the Commonwealth's fundamental political values, and sets the core membership criteria of the organisation. Its remit to evaluate the Harare Declaration lapses every two years; the remit must be renewed and its membership reviewed by the biennial Commonwealth Heads of Government Meeting.

CMAG was established in November 1995 at Millbrook Resort, in Queenstown, New Zealand, as a result of the Millbrook Commonwealth Action Programme, to punish serious or persistent violations of the Harare Declaration. It is composed of the Foreign Ministers (or equivalent) of eight Commonwealth member states, which may be augmented by either one or two further representatives of a region or interest involved in a particular case. There have been sixty-seven ordinary meetings, with the hosting of regular meetings traditionally at Commonwealth Secretariat headquarters at Marlborough House during Commonwealth Week, and on the sidelines of the United Nations General Assembly at the United Nations Headquarters in New York, every September.

== History ==
In its first meeting, CMAG decided that its initial focus would be upon the three (then-)military dictatorships of The Gambia, Nigeria, and Sierra Leone, and approved of the Commonwealth's suspension of Nigeria from the organisation earlier in the year. These three countries would form the mainstay of the work of CMAG, and form the whole of its reports, until the 1999 coup d'état in Pakistan necessitated it to vote unanimously to suspend Pakistan from the Commonwealth. Nigeria's reintegration was deemed complete by 1999, when its suspension was lifted; indeed, it was chosen to be a member of CMAG prior to the thirteenth meeting.

In 2000, the situations in Fiji and the Solomon Islands were put under permanent scrutiny, as was that in Zimbabwe in 2001. Gambia was taken off the group's formal agenda at the seventeenth meeting. Due to its acrimonious withdrawal from the Commonwealth in 2003, the issue of Zimbabwe, which had dominated the affairs of the Commonwealth since 2001, became moot and was not discussed from 2004 onwards, while Fiji was taken off the agenda due to encouraging progress in that country's political progress.

At its twenty-fourth meeting, in September 2004, it was decided that (at least in principle) CMAG should meet once a year, and preferably in New York. An extraordinary meeting was called for the 8 December 2006 in light of the 2006 coup d'état, at which it was decided to suspend Fiji's membership of the Commonwealth.

On 12 November 2007, the Commonwealth gave Pakistan a 10-day deadline to restore its constitution and lift other emergency measures or face suspension. By 22 November 2007, the CMAG voted to suspend Pakistan from Commonwealth Membership.

== Membership ==
Since 2003, the group has included the eight members, plus a representative of the Commonwealth Chairperson-in-Office's country. These have been, successively, Nigeria, Malta, Uganda, and Trinidad and Tobago.

Term	I	II	III	IV	V	VI	VII	VIII	Ex officio
1995 - 1997	Jamaica	Canada	New Zealand	Malaysia	United Kingdom	South Africa	Ghana	Zimbabwe	V A C A N T
1997 - 1999	Barbados	Canada	New Zealand	Malaysia	United Kingdom	Botswana	Ghana	Zimbabwe	V A C A N T
1999 - 2002	Barbados	Canada	Australia	Malaysia	United Kingdom	Botswana	Nigeria	Bangladesh	V A C A N T
2002 - 2003	Bahamas	Samoa	Australia	India	Malta	Botswana	Nigeria	Bangladesh	V A C A N T
2003 - 2005	Bahamas	Samoa	Canada	India	Malta	Lesotho	Tanzania	Sri Lanka	Nigeria
2005 - 2007	Saint Lucia	Papua New Guinea	Canada	Malaysia	United Kingdom	Lesotho	Tanzania	Sri Lanka	Malta
2007 - 2009	Saint Lucia	Papua New Guinea	New Zealand	Malaysia	United Kingdom	Namibia	Ghana	Sri Lanka	Uganda
2009 - 2011	Jamaica	Australia	New Zealand	Bangladesh	Vanuatu	Namibia	Ghana	Maldives	Trinidad and Tobago
2011 - 2013	Jamaica	Canada	Trinidad and Tobago	Bangladesh	Vanuatu	Tanzania	Sierra Leone	Maldives	Australia
2013 - 2015	Guyana	Solomon Islands	Pakistan	Cyprus	India	Tanzania	Sierra Leone	New Zealand	Sri Lanka
2015 - present	Guyana	Solomon Islands	Pakistan	Cyprus	India	Kenya	Namibia	New Zealand	Malta
