= Harare Declaration =

1991 statement of the Commonwealth of Nations' core values and membership criteria

The Harare Commonwealth Declaration was a declaration of the Commonwealth of Nations, setting out the Commonwealth's core principles and values, detailing the Commonwealth's membership criteria, and redefining and reinforcing its purpose. The Declaration was issued in Harare, Zimbabwe, on 20 October 1991, during the twelfth Commonwealth Heads of Government Meeting. It reaffirmed the political principles laid out in the Singapore Declaration of twenty years before, and (along with the Singapore Declaration) is considered one of the two most important documents to the Commonwealth's uncodified constitution, until the adoption of the Charter of the Commonwealth in 2012.

The Singapore Declaration had committed the Commonwealth to several principles in 1971: world peace and support for the United Nations; individual liberty and egalitarianism; opposition to racism; opposition to colonialism; the eradication of poverty, ignorance, disease, and economic inequality; free trade; institutional co-operation; multilateralism; and the rejection of international coercion. The Harare Declaration reaffirmed all these except the last. It also emphasised in particular a few of the principles and values mentioned in Singapore as integral to the Commonwealth project:

- We believe that international peace and order, global economic development and the rule of international law are essential to the security and prosperity of mankind;
- We believe in the liberty of the individual under the law, in equal rights for all citizens regardless of gender, race, colour, creed or political belief, and in the individual's inalienable right to participate by means of free and democratic political processes in framing the society in which he or she lives;
- We recognise racial prejudice and intolerance as a dangerous sickness and a threat to healthy development, and racial discrimination as an unmitigated evil;
- We oppose all forms of racial oppression, and we are committed to the principles of human dignity and equality;
- We recognise the importance and urgency of economic and social development to satisfy the basic needs and aspirations of the vast majority of the peoples of the world, and seek the progressive removal of the wide disparities in living standards amongst our members.

At Harare, the Heads of Government dedicated themselves to applying these principles to then-current issues, such as the end of the Cold War, the near-completion of decolonisation, and the impending end of the apartheid government in South Africa. The declaration also charted a course for the Commonwealth to take it into the next century.

The next part of the declaration details the purpose of the Commonwealth, and the activities in which it ought to engage to further the values expounded.

Critical to the document is the removal of a reference to the opposition to international coercion, which had been included in the Singapore Declaration. The implication at Singapore was that not even the Commonwealth itself had any right to enforce its other core values, as they could only be enforced by using coercive powers. This apparent conflict was resolved at Harare, and further clarified by the Millbrook Commonwealth Action Programme, which clearly mandated the Commonwealth to concern itself with its members' internal situations.

In 2002, Zimbabwe was suspended for breaching the Harare Declaration. The country withdrew from the Commonwealth in 2003 when the Commonwealth refused to lift the suspension.
