= Member states of the Commonwealth of Nations =

Commonwealth of Nations Current member states Former member states British Overseas Territories and Crown Dependencies

The Commonwealth of Nations is a voluntary association of 56 sovereign states, referred to as Commonwealth countries. Most of them were British colonies or dependencies of those colonies.

No government in the Commonwealth exercises power over the others, as is the case in a political union. Rather, the Commonwealth is an international organisation in which countries with diverse social, political, and economic backgrounds are regarded as equal in status, and cooperate within a framework of common values and goals, as outlined in the Singapore Declaration issued in 1971. Such common values and goals include the promotion of democracy, human rights, good governance, the rule of law, civil liberties, equality before the law, free trade, multilateralism, and world peace, which are promoted through multilateral projects and meetings, such as the Commonwealth Games, held once every four years.

The symbol of this free association is the Head of the Commonwealth, currently King Charles III. All heads of the Commonwealth to date have been monarchs of the United Kingdom. The office of Head of the Commonwealth does not imbue the holder with any political or executive power over any Commonwealth member states; the position is purely symbolic and titular, and it is the Commonwealth Secretary-General who is the chief executive of the Commonwealth.

The Commonwealth was first officially formed in 1926 when the Balfour Declaration of the Imperial Conference recognised the full sovereignty of Dominions. Known as the British Commonwealth of Nations, the original and therefore earliest members were Australia, Canada, the Irish Free State, Newfoundland, New Zealand, South Africa, and the United Kingdom. It was re-stated by the 1930 conference and incorporated in the Statute of Westminster the following year (although Australia and New Zealand did not adopt the statute until 1942 and 1947, respectively). In 1949, the London Declaration marked the birth of the modern Commonwealth and the adoption of its present name. The members have a combined population of 2.6 billion, almost a third of the world's population, of whom 1.419 billion live in India, and 95% live in Africa and Asia combined.

The most recent members to join were the Francophone African nations of Gabon and Togo on 29 June 2022, who along with Mozambique and Rwanda, are unusual in not having a historical constitutional relationship with the United Kingdom or other Commonwealth states.

As of 2026, fifteen of the member states are Commonwealth realms, with the Head of the Commonwealth as their heads of state, five others are monarchies with their own individual monarchs (Brunei (since 1984), Eswatini (since 1968; formerly Swaziland), Lesotho (since 1966), Malaysia (since 1963), and Tonga (since 1970)), and the rest are republics.

The Republic of Ireland (as of 1949 according to the Commonwealth; 1936 according to the Irish government) and Zimbabwe (2003) are former members of the Commonwealth. Zimbabwe is in the process of trying to return to its membership of the Commonwealth since Emmerson Mnangagwa became President of Zimbabwe when Robert Mugabe was overthrown in the 2017 Zimbabwean coup d'etat.

== Current member states ==
All dates below are provided by the Commonwealth of Nations Secretariat members list, and population figures are as of 1 February 2020.

| Country | First joined | UN continental region | UN geographical subregion | Population | System of government | Notes^{[A]} |
|---|---|---|---|---|---|---|
| Antigua and Barbuda | 1 November 1981 | Americas | Caribbean | 94,298 | Unitary Commonwealth realm | |
| Australia | 19 November 1926 | Oceania | Australasia | 26,256,970 | Federal Commonwealth realm | Australia was one of the original Dominions at the time of the Balfour Declaration of 1926 and the Statute of Westminster 1931, although the statute was not adopted in Australia until 1942 (with retroactive effect from 1939). The Australia Act 1986 eliminated the remaining possibilities for the UK to legislate with effect in Australia, for the UK to be involved in Australian government, and for an appeal from any Australian court to a British court (Judicial Committee of the Privy Council. |
| The Bahamas | 10 July 1973 | Americas | Caribbean | 412,623 | Unitary Commonwealth realm | |
| Bangladesh | 18 April 1972 | Asia | Southern Asia | 172,954,319 | Unitary Westminster republic | Formerly East Pakistan. Declared independence from Pakistan in 1971. |
| Barbados | 30 November 1966 | Americas | Caribbean | 281,995 | Unitary Westminster republic | Barbados removed Queen Elizabeth II as its head of state and became a republic on 30 November 2021. Dame Sandra Mason, the last Governor-General of Barbados was installed as the first President of Barbados. |
| Belize | 21 September 1981 | Americas | Central America | 410,825 | Unitary Commonwealth realm | Formerly British Honduras. Name changed on 1 June 1973 to the Colony of Belize. |
| Botswana | 30 September 1966 | Africa | Southern Africa | 2,675,352 | Unitary parliamentary republic with an executive presidency. Sir Seretse Khama became the first President of Botswana. | Formerly the Bechuanaland Protectorate. |
| Brunei | 1 January 1984 | Asia | South-eastern Asia | 452,524 | Unitary Islamic absolute monarchy | Formerly a British protected monarchy. Sultan Hassanal Bolkiah is also Prime Minister of Brunei as well as Brunei's Sultan. |
| Cameroon | 1 November 1995 | Africa | Middle Africa | 28,647,293 | Unitary semi-presidential republic | Most of the country was the formerly French mandate territory (later UN trust territory) of Cameroun, which gained independence from France on 1 January 1960. It united with the much smaller former British mandate/trust territory of Southern Cameroons, which gained independence from the United Kingdom on 1 October 1961. |
| Canada | 19 November 1926 | Americas | North America | 39,244,168 | Federal Commonwealth realm | Canada was the first among the several original Dominions at the time of the Balfour Declaration of 1926 and the Statute of Westminster 1931. Incorporated another original Dominion, Newfoundland, on 31 March 1949. The Canada Act 1982 formally ended the "request and consent" provisions of the Statute of Westminster 1931 in relation to Canada, whereby the British parliament had a general power to pass laws extending to Canada at its own request. |
| Cyprus^{[D]} | 13 March 1961 | Asia | Western Asia | 1,260,138 | Unitary presidential republic | Gained independence from the United Kingdom on 16 August 1960 with Archbishop Makarios III as the first President of Cyprus. The United Kingdom retains military bases at Akrotiri and Dhekelia. Northern Cyprus is not recognised by the Commonwealth as an independent state, but as a legitimate part of the Republic of Cyprus. Cyprus is, along with Malta, also a European Union member state. |
| Dominica | 3 November 1978 | Americas | Caribbean | 73,040 | Unitary Westminster republic | Dominica has always been a republic since independence. The last Governor of Dominica, Sir Louis Cools-Lartigue was installed as the first President of Dominica as an interim measure. |
| Eswatini | 6 September 1968 | Africa | Southern Africa | 1,210,822 | Unitary absolute monarchy | Joined as the Kingdom of Swaziland under King Sobhuza II, subsequently changing its name to Kingdom of Eswatini on 19 April 2018 by a decree of King Mswati III. |
| Fiji^{[B]} | 10 October 1970 | Oceania | Melanesia | 936,375 | Unitary Westminster republic | Was the Dominion of Fiji from 1970 until it was overthrown in October 1987 by Sitiveni Rabuka. The last Governor-General of Fiji, Ratu Sir Penaia Ganilau ended up becoming the first President of Fiji. Declared to have been expelled in 1987; rejoined in 1997; suspended on 6 June 2000; suspension lifted on 20 December 2001; again suspended on 8 December 2006 because of the 2006 Fijian coup d'état by Frank Bainimarama. Suspension lifted on 26 September 2014 after elections were finally held. |
| Gabon^{[B]} | 25 June 2022 | Africa | Middle Africa | 2,436,566 | Unitary presidential republic | Gained independence from France on 17 August 1960. The third (after Mozambique and Rwanda) to be admitted to the Commonwealth without any former colonial or constitutional links with the United Kingdom. Partially suspended on 18 September 2023 following the military coup that ousted President Ali Bongo the previous month, with two years given by the Commonwealth Ministerial Action Group for the country to hold new elections before a full suspension of membership would be considered. On 15 July 2025, the Commonwealth Ministerial Action Group lifted the sanctions after Nguema was elected president in April with 94 percent of the vote. |
| The Gambia | 18 February 1965 | Africa | Western Africa | 2,773,168 | Unitary presidential republic | Became a republic on 24 April 1970 with Sir Dawda Jawara as first President of the Gambia. Withdrew on 3 October 2013, citing "neocolonialism" by way of a decree of Yahya Jammeh, the then-dictator. Following the election of Adama Barrow as President of The Gambia in 2016, it submitted an application to rejoin the Commonwealth on 22 January 2018, and rejoined on 8 February 2018. |
| Ghana | 6 March 1957 | Africa | Western Africa | 34,121,985 | Unitary presidential republic | Became independent as the Dominion of Ghana, proclaimed a republic on 1 July 1960 with Kwame Nkrumah as the first President of Ghana. |
| Grenada | 7 February 1974 | Americas | Caribbean | 126,183 | Unitary Commonwealth realm | |
| Guyana | 26 May 1966 | Americas | South America | 813,834 | Unitary presidential republic | Gained independence as the Dominion of Guyana. Became a republic on 23 February 1970. Sir Edward Luckhoo, who was the last Governor-General of Guyana became an interim head of state, but Arthur Chung was appointed the first President of Guyana as a ceremonial head of state. Forbes Burnham, the former Prime Minister of Guyana became the first executive President of the Co-Operative Republic of Guyana under the 1980 Constitution of Guyana. |
| India | 15 August 1947 | Asia | Southern Asia | 1,428,627,663 | Federal Westminster republic | Gained independence as the Dominion of India. India became the first Commonwealth republic on 26 January 1950 with Rajendra Prasad as the first President of India and Jawaharlal Nehru becoming the Republic's first Prime Minister, as he had been the Dominion's Prime Minister since independence. Incorporated former French India (Chandannagar from 2 May 1950 and Puducherry, Karaikal, Yanam and Mahé from 1 November 1954), former Portuguese India (Goa, Daman and Diu from 19 December 1961 and Dadra and Nagar Haveli formally from 1961) and Sikkim (from 16 May 1975). |
| Jamaica | 6 August 1962 | Americas | Caribbean | 2,825,544 | Unitary Commonwealth realm | |
| Kenya | 12 December 1963 | Africa | Eastern Africa | 55,100,586 | Unitary presidential republic | Gained independence as the Dominion of Kenya. Became the Republic of Kenya exactly 1 year later with Jomo Kenyatta as the first President of Kenya |
| Kiribati | 12 July 1979 | Oceania | Micronesia | 133,515 | Unitary parliamentary republic with an executive presidency. Ieremia Tabai became the first President of Kiribati. | Formerly part of the Gilbert and Ellice Islands, then the Colony of the Gilbert Islands. |
| Lesotho | 4 October 1966 | Africa | Southern Africa | 2,330,318 | Unitary Westminster monarchy^{[E]} | Formerly the British protectorate of Basutoland. King Moshoeshoe II became the first King of Lesotho, as he was Paramount Chief of Basutoland from 1960. |
| Malawi | 6 July 1964 | Africa | Eastern Africa | 20,931,751 | Unitary presidential republic | Formerly Nyasaland. Gained independence as the Dominion of Malawi. The Republic of Malawi was declared exactly 2 years later, with the Prime Minister, Hastings Kamuzu Banda as the first President of Malawi. |
| Malaysia | 31 August 1957 | Asia | South-eastern Asia | 34,308,525 | Federal Westminster monarchy^{[E]} | Joined as the Federation of Malaya in 1957; reformed as Malaysia on 16 September 1963 with its federation with Singapore (which became an independent republic on 9 August 1965), North Borneo, and Sarawak. |
| Maldives | 9 July 1982 | Asia | Southern Asia | 521,021 | Unitary presidential republic | Formerly a British protected monarchy. Gained independence from the United Kingdom on 26 July 1965 as an independent kingdom outside the Commonwealth with the Sultan, Muhammad Fareed Didi being declared the King of the Maldives. Became a republic on 11 November 1968 with Ibrahim Nasir as the first President of the Maldives under the second republic. A special member from 9 July 1982 until 20 July 1985. Withdrew on 13 October 2016. Rejoined on 1 February 2020. |
| Malta^{[F]} | 21 September 1964 | Europe | Southern Europe | 532,616 | Unitary Westminster republic | Gained independence from the United Kingdom on 21 September 1964 as the State of Malta. Became a republic on 13 December 1974. Sir Anthony Mamo, the last Governor-General of Malta, was installed as the first President of Malta. Malta is, along with Cyprus, also a member state of the European Union. |
| Mauritius | 12 March 1968 | Africa | Eastern Africa | 1,263,939 | Unitary Westminster republic | Gained independence as the Dominion of Mauritius. Became a republic on 12 March 1992 with the last Governor-General of Mauritius, Sir Veerasamy Ringadoo as the first President of Mauritius. |
| Mozambique | 13 November 1995 | Africa | Eastern Africa | 33,897,354 | Unitary semi-presidential republic | Former dependency of Portuguese India until 1752. Gained independence from Portugal on 25 June 1975. The first country to be admitted to the Commonwealth without any formal colonial or constitutional links with the United Kingdom. |
| Namibia | 21 March 1990 | Africa | Southern Africa | 2,604,172 | Unitary semi-presidential republic | Formerly South West Africa. Gained independence from South Africa with Samuel Nujoma as the first President of Namibia. Includes Walvis Bay and the Penguin Islands transferred by South Africa at midnight 28 February 1994. |
| Nauru^{[B]} | 29 November 1968 | Oceania | Micronesia | 12,780 | Unitary parliamentary republic with an executive presidency. Hammer DeRoburt became the first President of Nauru. | Gained independence on 31 January 1968 from joint trusteeship of Australia, New Zealand and the United Kingdom. A special member from 29 November 1968 until 1 May 1999, when it became a full member, before reverting to special status in January 2006. A full member again since June 2011. |
| New Zealand | 19 November 1926 | Oceania | Australia and New Zealand | 5,163,908 | Unitary Commonwealth realm | Granted nominal independence (Dominion status) on 26 September 1907. One of the original Dominions at the time of the Balfour Declaration of 1926 and the Statute of Westminster 1931, although the Statute was not adopted in New Zealand until 1947. Removed final links with the British Parliament in 1986. Removed the final link with the British legal system (Judicial Committee of the Privy Council) in 2003. |
| Nigeria | 1 October 1960 | Africa | Western Africa | 223,804,632 | Federal presidential republic | Gained independence as a federal Dominion titled the Federation of Nigeria. Incorporated the former British mandate/trust territory of Northern Cameroons on 31 May 1961. The Federal Republic was declared on 1 October 1963, with the last Governor-General of Nigeria, Nnamdi Azikiwe, becoming the first President of Nigeria. Suspended in 1995, the suspension was lifted in 1999. |
| Pakistan | 14 August 1947^{[C]} | Asia | Southern Asia | 240,485,658 | Federal Westminster republic | Gained independence as the Dominion of Pakistan. The Republic was declared on 23 March 1956 with the last Governor-General of Pakistan, Iskander Mirza, becoming the first President of Pakistan. Includes the city of Gwadar, transferred from Muscat and Oman on 8 September 1958. Included Bangladesh (then known as East Pakistan) until 1971. Left Commonwealth in January 1972, rejoined 1990, effective retroactively from October 1989; suspended in 1999, suspension lifted in 2004; again suspended in 2007, suspension lifted in 2008. |
| Papua New Guinea | 16 September 1975 | Oceania | Melanesia | 10,329,931 | Unitary Commonwealth realm | Gained independence from Australia. |
| Rwanda | 29 November 2009 | Africa | Eastern Africa | 14,094,683 | Unitary presidential republic | Gained independence from Belgium on 1 July 1962. The second country (after Mozambique) to be admitted to the Commonwealth without any former colonial or constitutional links with the United Kingdom. Admitted despite the Commonwealth Human Rights Initiative (CHRI) finding that "the state of governance and human rights in Rwanda does not satisfy Commonwealth standards", and that it "does not therefore qualify for admission". |
| Saint Kitts and Nevis^{[B]} | 19 September 1983 | Americas | Caribbean | 47,755 | Federal Commonwealth realm | |
| Saint Lucia | 22 February 1979 | Americas | Caribbean | 180,251 | Unitary Commonwealth realm | |
| Saint Vincent and the Grenadines | 27 October 1979 | Americas | Caribbean | 103,698 | Unitary Commonwealth realm | A special member from 27 October 1979 until 1 June 1985. |
| Samoa^{[B]} | 28 August 1970 | Oceania | Polynesia | 225,681 | Unitary Westminster republic | From 1914 to 1961, Western Samoa was the Territory of Western Samoa. Gained independence from New Zealand on 1 January 1962 with Malietoa Tanumafili II as the first Head of state of Samoa. Entered into an unusual relationship with the Commonwealth. Joined as Western Samoa, subsequently changing its name to Samoa on 4 July 1997. |
| Seychelles | 29 June 1976 | Africa | Eastern Africa | 120,622 | Unitary presidential republic | Sir James Mancham became first President of the Seychelles, but he was overthrown in 1977 by France-Albert René who had been the Prime Minister. |
| Sierra Leone | 27 April 1961 | Africa | Western Africa | 8,791,092 | Unitary presidential republic | Gained independence as the Dominion of Sierra Leone. Became a republic in 1971 with Siaka Stevens as the first President of Sierra Leone. |
| Singapore^{[B]} | 15 October 1965 | Asia | South-eastern Asia | 5,673,743 | Unitary Westminster republic | Gained independence from the United Kingdom and joined Federation of Malaysia on 16 September 1963. Became independent on 9 August 1965 with Yusof bin Ishak as the first President of Singapore. While joining in 1966, the effective date is from its date of independence. |
| Solomon Islands | 7 July 1978 | Oceania | Melanesia | 740,424 | Unitary Commonwealth realm | |
| South Africa | 19 November 1926 | Africa | Southern Africa | 60,414,495 | Unitary parliamentary republic with an executive presidency | Granted nominal independence (Dominion status) on 31 May 1910 as the Union of South Africa. One of the original Dominions at the time of the Balfour Declaration of 1926 and Statute of Westminster 1931. Left on 31 May 1961 with the last Governor-General of South Africa, Charles Robberts Swart as the first State President of South Africa; rejoined 1 June 1994 under Nelson Mandela, the President of South Africa. |
| Sri Lanka | 4 February 1948 | Asia | Southern Asia | 22,037,000 | Unitary semi-presidential republic | Joined as the Dominion of Ceylon, subsequently changing its name in 1972. Became a republic in 1972 with the last Governor-General of Ceylon, William Gopallawa, becoming the first President of Sri Lanka. |
| Tanzania | 9 December 1961 | Africa | Eastern Africa | 67,438,106 | Unitary presidential republic | Tanganyika joined the Commonwealth on 9 December 1961 as an independent Dominion, became a republic exactly 1 year later under Julius Nyerere as President of Tanganyika, with the islands of Zanzibar following suit later. The two subsequently merged to form Tanzania on 26 April 1964. President Nyerere became the first President of Tanzania. |
| Togo^{[B]} | 25 June 2022 | Africa | Western Africa | 9,053,799 | Unitary presidential republic | The country was the formerly French and British mandate territory (later UN trust territory) of Togoland after the First World War in 1919; British Togoland (which would be attached to the Gold Coast in 1956 and become Ghana on 6 March 1957) and French Togoland. Independence of French Togoland as Togo from France on 27 April 1960. |
| Tonga | 4 June 1970 | Oceania | Polynesia | 107,773 | Unitary constitutional monarchy | Formerly a British protected monarchy from 1900 until 1970. |
| Trinidad and Tobago | 31 August 1962 | Americas | Caribbean | 1,534,937 | Unitary Westminster republic | Granted independence on 31 August 1962. Became a republic on 1 August 1976 under the Republic of Trinidad and Tobago Constitution Act 1976, passed by the Parliament of Trinidad and Tobago. The last Governor-General of Trinidad and Tobago, Sir Ellis Clarke became the first President of Trinidad and Tobago. |
| Tuvalu^{[B]} | 1 October 1978 | Oceania | Polynesia | 11,396 | Unitary Commonwealth realm | A special member from 1 October 1978 until 1 September 2000. |
| Uganda | 9 October 1962 | Africa | Eastern Africa | 48,582,334 | Unitary presidential republic | Gained independence as the Dominion of Uganda, then became the Sovereign State of Uganda exactly 1 year later. Uganda's formal status as a republic was declared in 1967 after the overthrow of the Kabaka of Buganda Mutesa II in 1966. Former Prime Minister of Uganda Milton Obote then seized the presidency. |
| United Kingdom | 19 November 1926 | Europe | Northern Europe | 67,184,072 | Unitary Commonwealth realm | Balfour Declaration of 1926 and the Parliament of the United Kingdom enacted the Statute of Westminster 1931. Has four individual nations or constituent countries within the UK: England, Northern Ireland, Scotland, and Wales. All, except for England, have a devolved form of government in Belfast, Cardiff, and Edinburgh. Also including British Overseas Territories. |
| Vanuatu^{[B]} | 30 July 1980 | Oceania | Melanesia | 334,506 | Unitary Westminster republic | Formerly the New Hebrides. Gained independence from joint rule (condominium) of France and the United Kingdom. Ati George Sokomanu became the first President of Vanuatu |
| Zambia | 24 October 1964 | Africa | Eastern Africa | 20,569,737 | Unitary presidential republic | Formerly Northern Rhodesia. Kenneth Kaunda became the first President of Zambia. |

A. Unless otherwise noted, independence was gained from the United Kingdom on the date (shown in column 2) of joining the Commonwealth.
B. Not a member of the Commonwealth Foundation.
C. Though Pakistan celebrates 14 August 1947 as its independence day, independence was officially granted at midnight, 15 August 1947. Therefore, its date of joining the Commonwealth would be 15 August 1947.
D. Geographically a part of Asia, considered a European country in political geography.
E. Constitutional monarchy that operates under a Westminster system. The monarch is not the same individual as the British monarch, hence making it not a Commonwealth realm.
F. In geology, the Maltese Islands are located on the African Plate. The island group lies approximately 200 km (120 mi) south of the boundary between the African Plate and the Eurasian Plate. In political geography, Malta is considered a European country.

== Former member states ==
| Country | Joined | UN Continental Region | UN Geographical Subregion | Left | Notes |
|---|---|---|---|---|---|
| Ireland | 19 November 1926 | Europe | Northern Europe | 18 April 1949 | The Partition of Ireland, in 1921, caused its division into the Irish Free State (later the Republic of Ireland) and Northern Ireland (which remained in the UK). The Irish Free State was one of the original Dominions at the time of the Balfour Declaration of 1926 and the Statute of Westminster 1931. Withdrew after passing The Republic of Ireland Act in 1948, accepted by the United Kingdom in the Ireland Act 1949. On 27 November 1998, Taoiseach Bertie Ahern raised the prospect of Ireland rejoining the Commonwealth, stating that it would "not be an unhealthy discussion" for Ireland. |
| Zimbabwe | 18 April 1980 | Africa | Southern Africa | 7 December 2003 | Rhodesia's Unilateral Declaration of Independence in 1965 was not recognised, but independence as Zimbabwe was recognised on 18 April 1980. Suspended on 19 March 2002. Withdrew voluntarily on 7 December 2003. On 15 May 2018, President Emmerson Mnangagwa submitted an application to rejoin the Commonwealth. |

== Dissolved member states ==
| Former country | Joined | UN Continental Region | UN Geographical Subregion | Dissolved | Rejoined as a part of | Notes |
|---|---|---|---|---|---|---|
| (Federation of Malaya) Malaya | 31 August 1957 | Asia | South-eastern Asia | 16 September 1963 | Malaysia | Reformed as the Federation of Malaysia with Singapore (became a separate member as an independent republic in 1965), North Borneo (Sabah), and Sarawak. |
| (Dominion of Newfoundland) Newfoundland | 19 November 1926 | Americas | Northern America | 31 March 1949 | Canada | One of the original Dominions at the time of the Balfour Declaration of 1926 and the Statute of Westminster 1931. Self-government suspended on 16 February 1934, merged into Canada on 31 March 1949. |
| Tanganyika | 9 December 1961 | Africa | Eastern Africa | 26 April 1964 | Tanzania | Tanganyika and Zanzibar merged to form the United Republic of Tanzania on 26 April 1964. |
| Zanzibar | 10 December 1963 | Africa | Eastern Africa | 26 April 1964 | Tanzania | Tanganyika and Zanzibar merged to form the United Republic of Tanzania on 26 April 1964. |

== Prospective member states ==
| Country | Applied | UN Continental Region | UN Geographical Subregion | Population | Notes |
|---|---|---|---|---|---|
| Burundi | 2013 | Africa | Eastern Africa | 10,524,117 | Gained independence from Belgium in 1962. Historically and culturally linked to Commonwealth member Rwanda, once forming a single country Ruanda-Urundi. In 2013, Burundi applied to join the Commonwealth. |
| Somaliland | 2009 (as an observer state) | Africa | Eastern Africa | ~3,500,000^{[G]} | Somaliland is an unrecognised self-declared sovereign state internationally recognised as a part of Somalia. It has applied to join the Commonwealth under observer status. Its borders are approximate to those of British Somaliland, which was a protectorate from 1884 to 1960. |
| South Sudan | 2011 | Africa | Eastern Africa | 13,670,642 | Gained independence from the United Kingdom as part of Sudan in 1956. Gained independence from Sudan in 2011. South Sudan is a member of the East African Community. |
| Suriname | 2012 | Americas | South America | 555,934 | English colony of Surinam from 1650 to 1667 and again controlled by the British from 1799 to 1816; subsequently a Dutch colony. In 2012, Suriname announced plans to join the Commonwealth and the British government has made it a priority to provide guidance to Suriname in applying for Commonwealth membership. |
| Zimbabwe | 2018 | Africa | Southern Africa | 16,150,362 | Under the presidency of Robert Mugabe, Zimbabwe dominated Commonwealth affairs, creating acrimonious splits in the organisation. Zimbabwe was suspended in 2002 for breaching the Harare Declaration. In 2003, when the Commonwealth refused to lift the suspension, Zimbabwe withdrew from the Commonwealth. Since then, the Commonwealth has played a major part in trying to end the political impasse and return Zimbabwe to a state of normality. On 15 May 2018, President Emmerson Mnangagwa submitted an application to rejoin the Commonwealth. |

G. The population figure is based on 2014 estimates.

== Other candidates ==
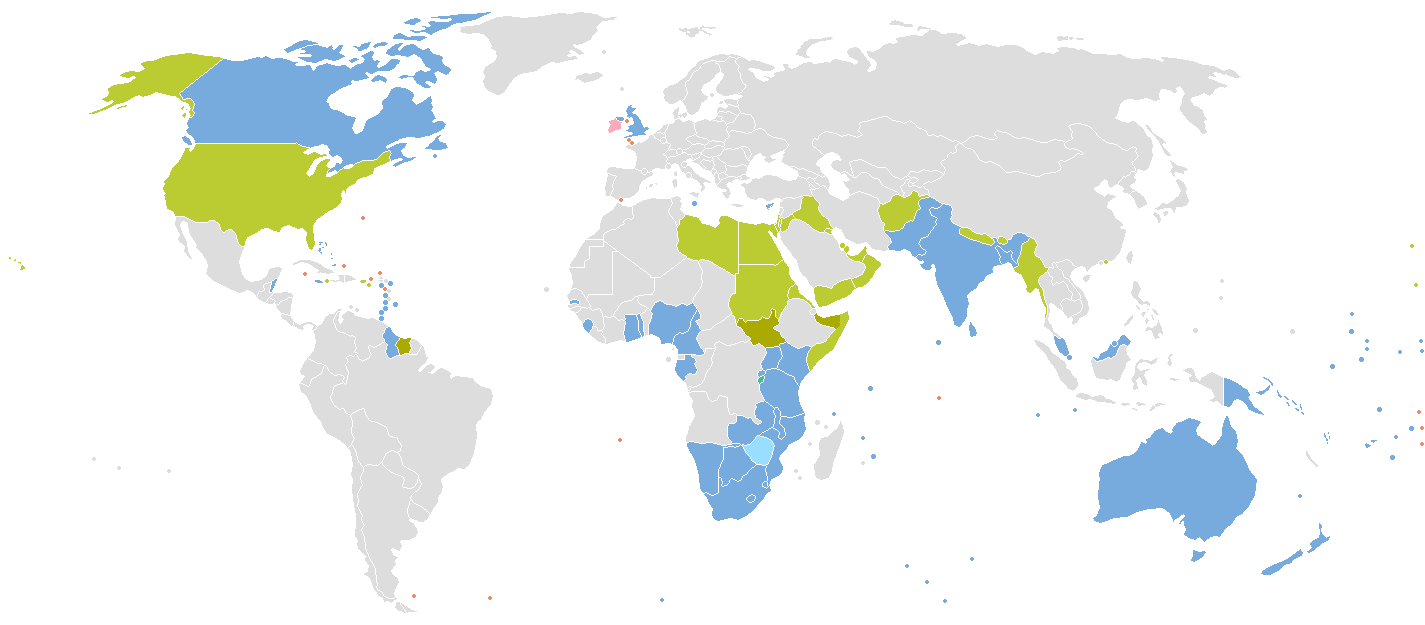
The Commonwealth of Nations currently has 56 members. Current Commonwealth members (dark blue) Overseas territories, associated states and crown dependencies (orange) Suspended members (yellow) Former members (pink) Former members applying to rejoin (light blue) Applicants without historical links to the UK (turquoise) Other states with historical links to the UK (light green) Applicants with historical links to the UK (dark green)

Other states which have expressed an interest in joining the Commonwealth over the years include:

| Country | UN Continental Region | UN Geographical Subregion | Source(s) |
|---|---|---|---|
| Algeria | Africa | Northern Africa | |
| Angola | Africa | Middle Africa | |
| Cambodia | Asia | South-eastern Asia | |
| Cook Islands | Oceania | Polynesia | |
| Israel | Asia | Western Asia | |
| Kuwait | Asia | Western Asia | |
| Madagascar | Africa | Eastern Africa | |
| Myanmar | Asia | South-eastern Asia | |
| Palestine | Asia | Western Asia | |
| Sudan | Africa | Northern Africa | |
| Timor-Leste | Asia | South-eastern Asia | |
| United States | North America | Northern America | |
| Yemen | Asia | Western Asia | |

The 2007 Commonwealth Heads of Government Meeting agreed on the core criteria for membership. An applicant country should have historic constitutional association with an existing Commonwealth member, aside from exceptional circumstances which are only considered on a case-by-case basis.

Most Commonwealth members have constitutional links with the United Kingdom and the former British Empire. Former British dependencies are eligible to join the Commonwealth providing they agree and commit to the Commonwealth principles, which were laid out in the Singapore Declaration and reaffirmed in the Lusaka Declaration, the Langkawi Declaration and the Harare Declaration.

== See also ==
- Commonwealth of Nations membership criteria
- List of countries and territories where English is an official language
- List of countries by English-speaking population
- List of current viceregal representatives of the Crown
- Zimbabwe and the Commonwealth of Nations
