= Commonwealth of Nations =

Political association which developed from the British Empire

- Flag Logo

- Current member states Former member states British Overseas Territories and Crown Dependencies
- Headquarters: Marlborough House, London, United Kingdom
- Working language: English
- Type: Voluntary association
- Member states: 56 states: Antigua and Barbuda; Australia; Bangladesh; Barbados; Belize; Botswana; Brunei; Cameroon; Canada; Cyprus; Dominica; Eswatini; Fiji; Gabon; Gambia; Ghana; Grenada; Guyana; India; Jamaica; Kenya; Kiribati; Lesotho; Malawi; Malaysia; Maldives; Malta; Mauritius; Mozambique; Namibia; Nauru; New Zealand; Nigeria; Pakistan; Papua New Guinea; Rwanda; Saint Kitts and Nevis; Saint Lucia; Saint Vincent and the Grenadines; Samoa; Seychelles; Sierra Leone; Singapore; Solomon Islands; South Africa; Sri Lanka; Tanzania; The Bahamas; Togo; Tonga; Trinidad and Tobago; Tuvalu; Uganda; United Kingdom; Vanuatu; Zambia

Leaders
  - Head: Charles III
  - Secretary-General: Shirley Ayorkor Botchwey
  - Chair-in-Office: Laʻauli Leuatea Schmidt

Establishment
  - Balfour Declaration: 19 November 1926
  - Statute of Westminster: 11 December 1931
  - London Declaration: 28 April 1949

Area
  - Total: 29,958,050 km^{2} (11,566,870 sq mi)

Population
  - 2016 estimate: 2,418,964,000
  - Density: 75/km^{2} (194.2/sq mi)
- Website thecommonwealth.org
Preceded by
British Empire

The Commonwealth of Nations, often referred to as the British Commonwealth or simply the Commonwealth, is an international association of 56 member states, the vast majority of which are former territories of its predecessor, the British Empire. They are connected through their use of the English language and their cultural and historical ties. Its chief institutions are the Commonwealth Secretariat, focusing on intergovernmental relations, and the Commonwealth Foundation, focusing on non-governmental relations between member nations. Additionally, numerous intergovernmental and civil organisations are officially recognised by the Secretariat.

The Commonwealth dates back to the first half of the 20th century, with the decolonisation of the Empire through the increased self-governance of its territories. It was defined as the British Commonwealth of Nations by the Balfour Declaration at the 1926 Imperial Conference, and formalised by the United Kingdom through the Statute of Westminster in 1931. In 1949, the London Declaration allowed India to remain in the association as a republic, with other countries following.

Commonwealth citizens enjoy benefits in some member countries, particularly in the United Kingdom, and Commonwealth countries are represented to one another by high commissions rather than embassies. Member states have no legal obligations to one another, notwithstanding institutional ties; for instance, the Judicial Committee of the Privy Council is the supreme court of 14 countries. With regard to trade, member states with a lower trade volume, such as a number of small Caribbean and Pacific countries, have a propensity to trade more with other Commonwealth countries, in contrast to larger countries with high-volume trade such as the United Kingdom and Canada, whose overall trade with other Commonwealth countries is less significant. The Commonwealth Charter defines their shared values of democracy, human rights, and the rule of law, as promoted by the quadrennial Commonwealth Games.

The head of the Commonwealth is Charles III. He is king of 15 member states, known as the Commonwealth realms, while 36 other members are republics, and five have different monarchs. Although he became head upon the death of his mother, Elizabeth II, the position is not technically hereditary. A majority of Commonwealth countries are small states, with small island developing states constituting almost half its membership.

== History ==
=== Conceptual origins ===
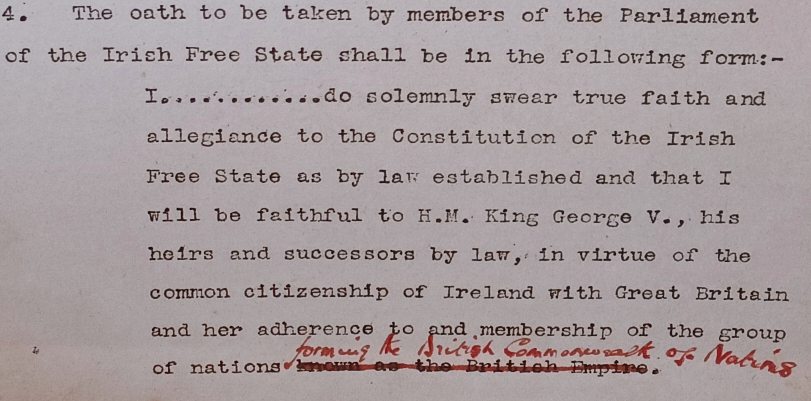
A draft of the 1921 Anglo-Irish Treaty, with "British Empire" crossed out and "British Commonwealth of Nations" added by hand

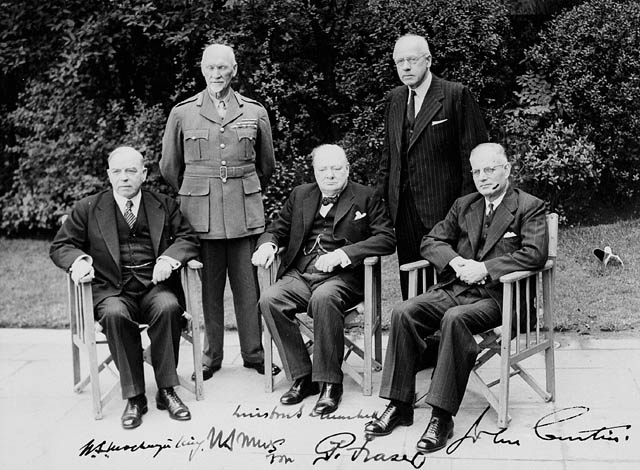
The prime ministers of the five members at the 1944 Commonwealth Prime Ministers' Conference: (L-R) Mackenzie King (Canada), Jan Smuts (South Africa), Winston Churchill (United Kingdom), Peter Fraser (New Zealand) and John Curtin (Australia)

Queen Elizabeth II, in her address to Canada on Dominion Day in 1959, pointed out that the Confederation of Canada on 1 July 1867 had been the birth of the "first independent country within the British Empire". She declared: "So, it also marks the beginning of that free association of independent states which is now known as the Commonwealth of Nations." As long ago as 18 January 1884 Lord Rosebery, while visiting Adelaide, South Australia, had described the changing British Empire, as some of its colonies became more independent, as a "Commonwealth of Nations". Conferences of British and colonial prime ministers occurred periodically from the first one in 1887, leading to the creation of the Imperial Conferences in 1911.

The Commonwealth developed from the imperial conferences. A specific proposal was presented by Jan Smuts in 1917 when he coined the term "the British Commonwealth of Nations" and envisioned the "future constitutional relations and readjustments in essence" at the Paris Peace Conference of 1919, attended by delegates from the Dominions as well as the United Kingdom. The term first received imperial statutory recognition in the Anglo-Irish Treaty of 1921, when the term British Commonwealth of Nations was substituted for British Empire in the wording of the oath taken by members of parliament of the Irish Free State.

=== Adoption and formalisation ===
In the Balfour Declaration at the 1926 Imperial Conference, the United Kingdom and its dominions agreed that they were "autonomous Communities within the British Empire, equal in status, in no way subordinate one to another in any aspect of their domestic or external affairs, though united by a common allegiance to the Crown, and freely associated as members of the British Commonwealth of Nations." The term 'Commonwealth' was officially adopted to describe the community.

These aspects of the relationship were formalised by the Statute of Westminster in 1931, which applied to Canada, the Irish Free State and South Africa without the need for ratification, but Australia, New Zealand and Newfoundland had to ratify the statute for it to take effect. Newfoundland never did as due to economic hardship and the need for financial assistance from London, Newfoundland voluntarily accepted the suspension of self-government in 1934 and governance reverted to direct control from London. Newfoundland later joined Canada as its tenth province in 1949. Australia and New Zealand ratified the statute in 1942 and 1947 respectively.

Although the Union of South Africa was not among the Dominions that needed to adopt the Statute of Westminster for it to take effect, two laws — the Status of the Union Act, 1934, and the Royal Executive Functions and Seals Act, 1934 — were passed by the Parliament of South Africa to confirm South Africa's status as a sovereign state, and to incorporate the Statute of Westminster into the law of South Africa.

=== Second World War ===
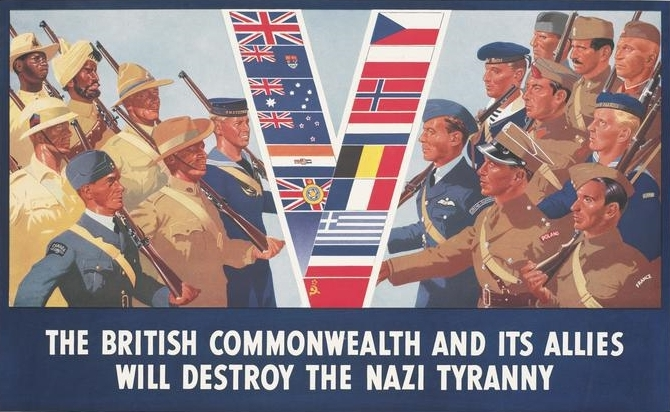
A poster from the Second World War, depicting soldiers from Britain, Canada, Australia, New Zealand, the Colony of Southern Rhodesia, South Africa and the British Raj

The Commonwealth and Empire were involved in every major theatre of the Second World War. This included the establishment of the British Commonwealth Air Training Plan by the governments of Australia, Canada, New Zealand and the United Kingdom for pilots from across the Empire and its Dominions. Immediately after the war, troops from Australia, Britain, India and New Zealand made up the British Commonwealth Occupation Force in Japan. This force was subsequently the basis of the British Commonwealth forces in Korea.

=== Decolonisation and self-governance ===
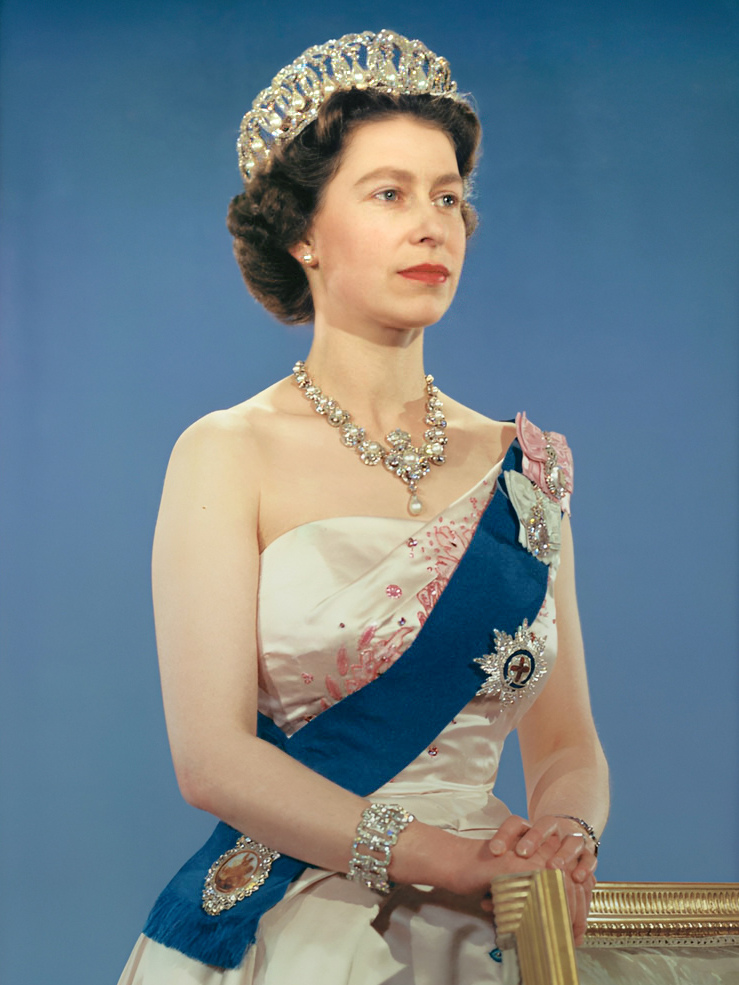
Queen Elizabeth II, the longest-serving Head of the Commonwealth, was in office for 70 years.

After the Second World War ended, the British Empire was gradually dismantled. Most of its components have become independent countries, whether Commonwealth realms or republics, and members of the Commonwealth. There remain the 14 mainly self-governing British Overseas Territories which retain some political association with the United Kingdom. In April 1949, following the London Declaration, the word "British" was dropped from the title of the Commonwealth to reflect its changing nature.

Burma (officially Myanmar since 1989) and Aden (now part of Yemen) are the only states that were British colonies at the time of the war not to have joined the Commonwealth upon independence. Former British protectorates and mandates that did not become members of the Commonwealth are Egypt (independent in 1922), Iraq (1932), Transjordan (1946), Mandatory Palestine (part of which became the State of Israel in 1948), Sudan (1956), British Somaliland (which united with the former Italian Somaliland in 1960 to form the Somali Republic), Kuwait (1961), Bahrain (1971), Oman (1971), Qatar (1971) and the United Arab Emirates (1971).

The post-war Commonwealth was given a fresh mission by Queen Elizabeth II in her Christmas Day 1953 broadcast, in which she envisioned the Commonwealth as "an entirely new conception – built on the highest qualities of the Spirit of Man: friendship, loyalty, and the desire for freedom and peace". However, the British treasury was so weak that it could not operate independently of the United States. Furthermore, the loss of defence and financial roles undermined Joseph Chamberlain's early 20th-century vision of a world empire that could combine Imperial Preference, mutual defence and social growth. In addition, the United Kingdom's cosmopolitan role in world affairs became increasingly limited, especially with the independence of India and Singapore. While British politicians at first hoped that the Commonwealth would preserve and project British influence, they gradually lost their enthusiasm, argues Krishnan Srinivasan. Early enthusiasm waned as British policies came under fire at Commonwealth meetings. Public opinion became troubled as immigration from non-white member states became large-scale (see also: Commonwealth diaspora).

The term "New Commonwealth" gained usage in the UK, especially in the 1960s and 1970s, to refer to recently decolonised countries, predominantly non-white and developing countries. It was often used in debates regarding immigration from these countries. The United Kingdom and the pre-1945 dominions became informally known as the "Old Commonwealth", or more pointedly as the "white Commonwealth", in reference to what had been known as the "White Dominions".

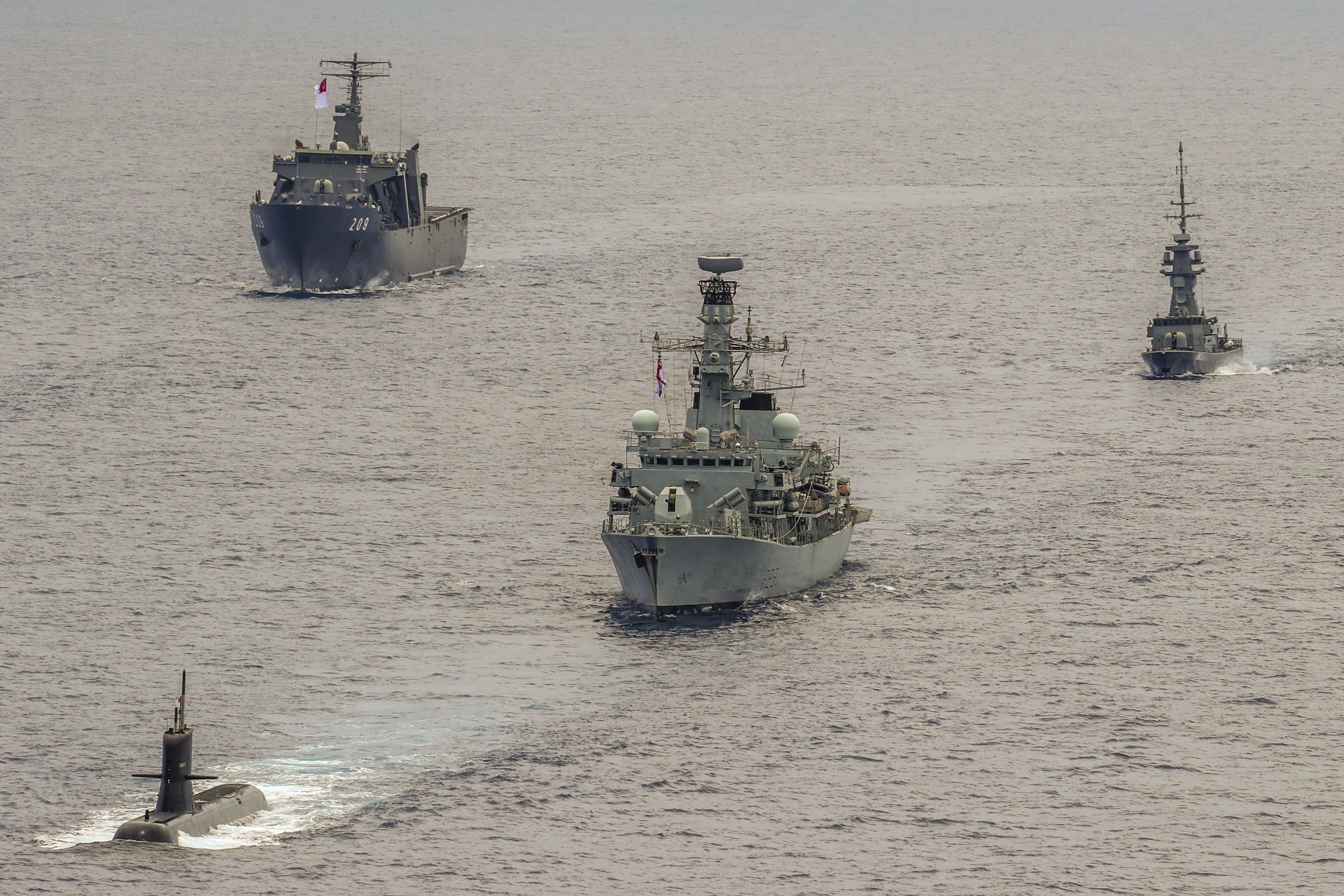
Warships during a Five Power Defence Arrangements joint exercise

The Five Power Defence Arrangements, a defence partnership between Commonwealth countries Australia, Britain, Malaysia, New Zealand and Singapore, was established in 1971.

=== Commonwealth republics ===
On 18 April 1949, Ireland formally became a republic in accordance with The Republic of Ireland Act 1948 passed by its parliament; in doing so, it also formally left the Commonwealth. While Ireland had not actively participated in the Commonwealth since the early 1930s, other dominions wished to become republics without losing Commonwealth ties. The issue came to a head in April 1949 at a Commonwealth prime ministers' meeting in London. Under the London Declaration, as drafted by V. K. Krishna Menon, India agreed, when it became a republic in January 1950, it would remain in the Commonwealth and accept the British Sovereign as a "symbol of the free association of its independent member nations and as such the Head of the Commonwealth". Upon hearing this, King George VI told Menon: "So, I've become 'as such'." Some other Commonwealth countries that have since become republics have chosen to leave, while others, such as Guyana, Mauritius and Dominica, have remained members.

India's inaugural prime minister Jawaharlal Nehru declared on 16 May 1949, shortly following the Declaration, during the Constituent Assembly Debates that:

We join the Commonwealth obviously because we think it is beneficial to us and to certain causes in the world that we wish to advance. The other countries of the Commonwealth want us to remain there because they think it is beneficial to them. It is mutually understood that it is to the advantage of the nations in the Commonwealth and therefore they join. At the same time, it is made perfectly clear that each country is completely free to go its own way; it may be that they may go, sometimes go so far as to break away from the Commonwealth...Otherwise, apart from breaking the evil parts of the association, it is better to keep a co-operative association going which may do good in this world rather than break it.

The London Declaration is often seen as marking the beginning of the modern Commonwealth. Following India's precedent, other nations became republics, or constitutional monarchies with their own monarchs. While some countries retained the same monarch as the United Kingdom, their monarchies developed differently and soon became (or had already become) essentially independent of the British monarchy. The monarch is regarded as a separate legal personality in each realm, even though the same person is monarch of each realm.

=== Proposals to include Europe ===
At a time when Germany and France, together with Belgium, Italy, Luxembourg, and the Netherlands, were planning what later became the European Union, and newly independent African countries were joining the Commonwealth, new ideas were floated to prevent the United Kingdom from becoming isolated in economic affairs. British trade with the Commonwealth was four times larger than its trade with Europe. In 1956 and 1957, the British government, under Prime Minister Anthony Eden, considered a "Plan G" to create a European free trade zone while also protecting the favoured status of the Commonwealth.

At the time of the Suez Crisis in 1956, and in the face of colonial unrest and international tensions, French prime minister Guy Mollet proposed to British prime minister Anthony Eden that their two countries be joined in a "union". When that proposal was turned down, Mollet suggested that France join the Commonwealth, possibly with "a common citizenship arrangement on the Irish basis". These ideas faded away with the end of the Suez Crisis.

=== Expansion and 21st century ===
The first member admitted without any constitutional link to the British Empire was Mozambique – a former Portuguese colony – in 1995 following its first democratic elections. Its entry preceded the Edinburgh Declaration and the current membership guidelines. In 2009, Rwanda became the second country admitted to the Commonwealth without any constitutional links to Britain. It was a Belgian trust territory that had been a district of German East Africa until World War I.

In 2022, Togo (a former French mandate territory) and Gabon (a former French colony) joined the Commonwealth, despite having never been under British rule. Togolese foreign minister Robert Dussey foresaw opportunities for Togolese citizens to learn English, and to benefit from access to education and culture. The country sought closer ties with the Anglophone world. Influenced by Togo's membership, the teaching of English in preschools and primary schools was introduced in 2023. Trade between Togo and Britain increased by 94 per cent in 2024; the country also sought to expand trade with India. Gabon was partially suspended from the Commonwealth in September 2023 following a military coup, with two years given by the Commonwealth Ministerial Action Group for the country to hold new elections before a full suspension would be considered. Gabon's partial suspension was lifted in July 2025, following a presidential election.

Commonwealth linkages became the subject of renewed interest during the second term of United States president Donald Trump. In 2025 during Russia's invasion of Ukraine, some Commonwealth countries aligned themselves with the pro-Ukraine "coalition of the willing" spearheaded by British prime minister Keir Starmer. During the 2025 Liberal Party leadership contest in Canada, in light of aggressive actions taken by America, future prime minister Mark Carney expressed support for deepening relations with Australia, Britain and New Zealand. Trump expressed interest in the United States becoming a member or "associate" member of the Commonwealth, following tabloid reporting that this would be proposed by Britain.

Writing about America's shirking of global responsibility and the supposed ineffectiveness of the United Nations, Australian-British lawyer Geoffrey Robertson opined that "Europe and the Commonwealth countries, plus Japan and Brazil and Indonesia, might together have more impact than the Security Council – if for example China moved to invade Taiwan." Amidst the Gaza war, Australia, Britain, Canada and New Zealand imposed sanctions on two Israeli government ministers, alongside Norway. In 2026, as Carney sought to unify middle powers, Antigua and Barbuda prime minister Gaston Browne argued in the Daily Telegraph that the Commonwealth was suited to this purpose.

== Structure ==
=== Head of the Commonwealth ===
Under the formula of the London Declaration, Charles III is the Head of the Commonwealth. However, when the monarch dies, the successor to the crown does not automatically become the new head of the Commonwealth. Despite this, at their meeting in April 2018, Commonwealth leaders agreed that Prince Charles should succeed his mother Elizabeth II as head after her death. The position is symbolic, representing the free association of independent members, the majority of which (36) are republics, and five have monarchs of different royal houses (Brunei, Eswatini, Lesotho, Malaysia and Tonga).

=== Commonwealth Heads of Government Meeting ===
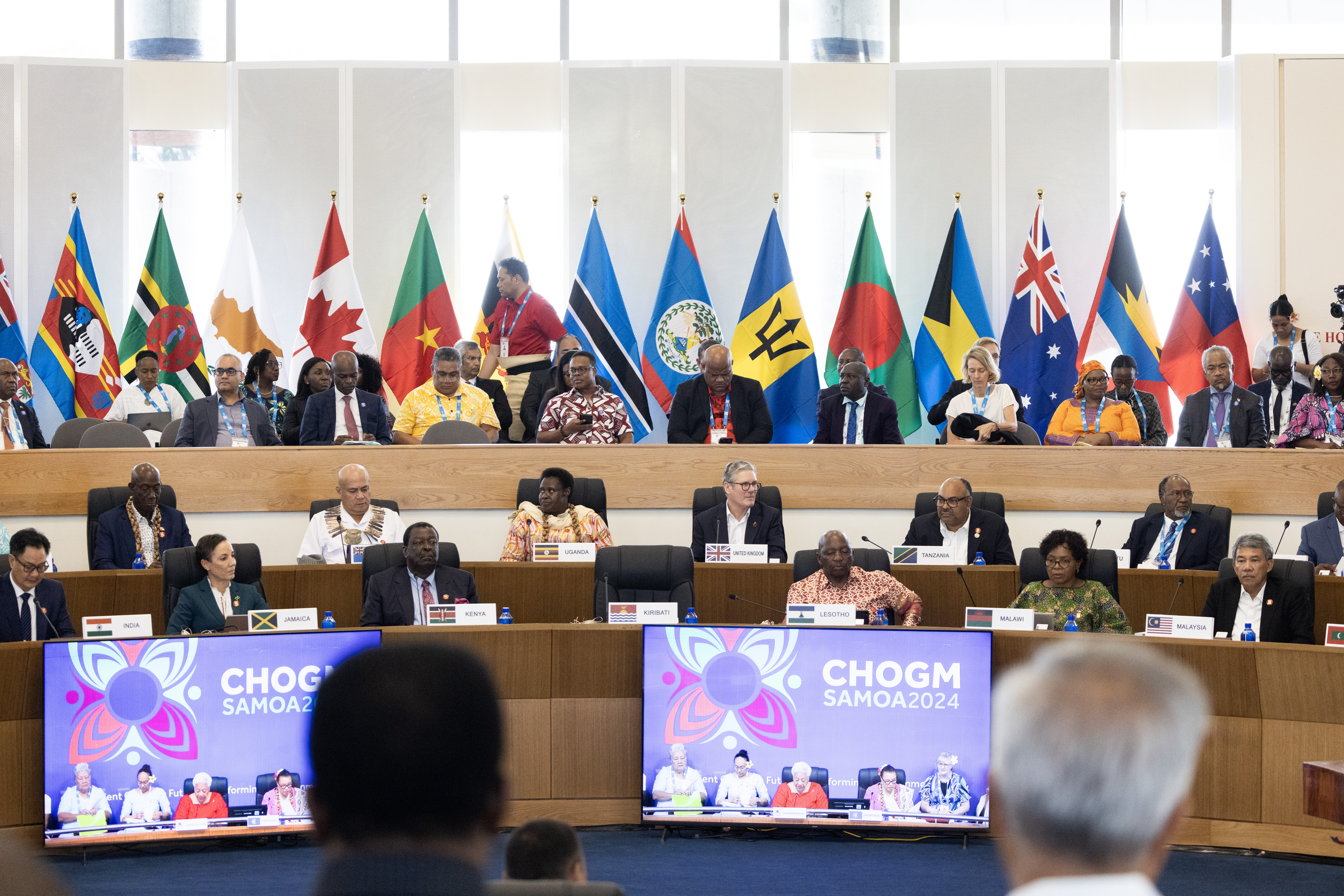
The 2024 Commonwealth Heads of Government Meeting in Samoa

The main decision-making forum of the organisation is the biennial Commonwealth Heads of Government Meeting (CHOGM), where Commonwealth Heads of Government, including (among others) prime ministers and presidents, assemble for several days to discuss matters of mutual interest. CHOGM is the successor to the Commonwealth Prime Ministers Meetings and, earlier, the Imperial Conferences and Colonial Conferences, dating back to 1887. There are also regular meetings of finance ministers, law ministers, health ministers and others. Members in arrears, as special members before them, are not invited to send representatives to either ministerial meetings or CHOGMs.

The head of government hosting the CHOGM is called the chair-in-office (CIO) and retains the position until the following CHOGM.

=== Commonwealth Secretariat ===
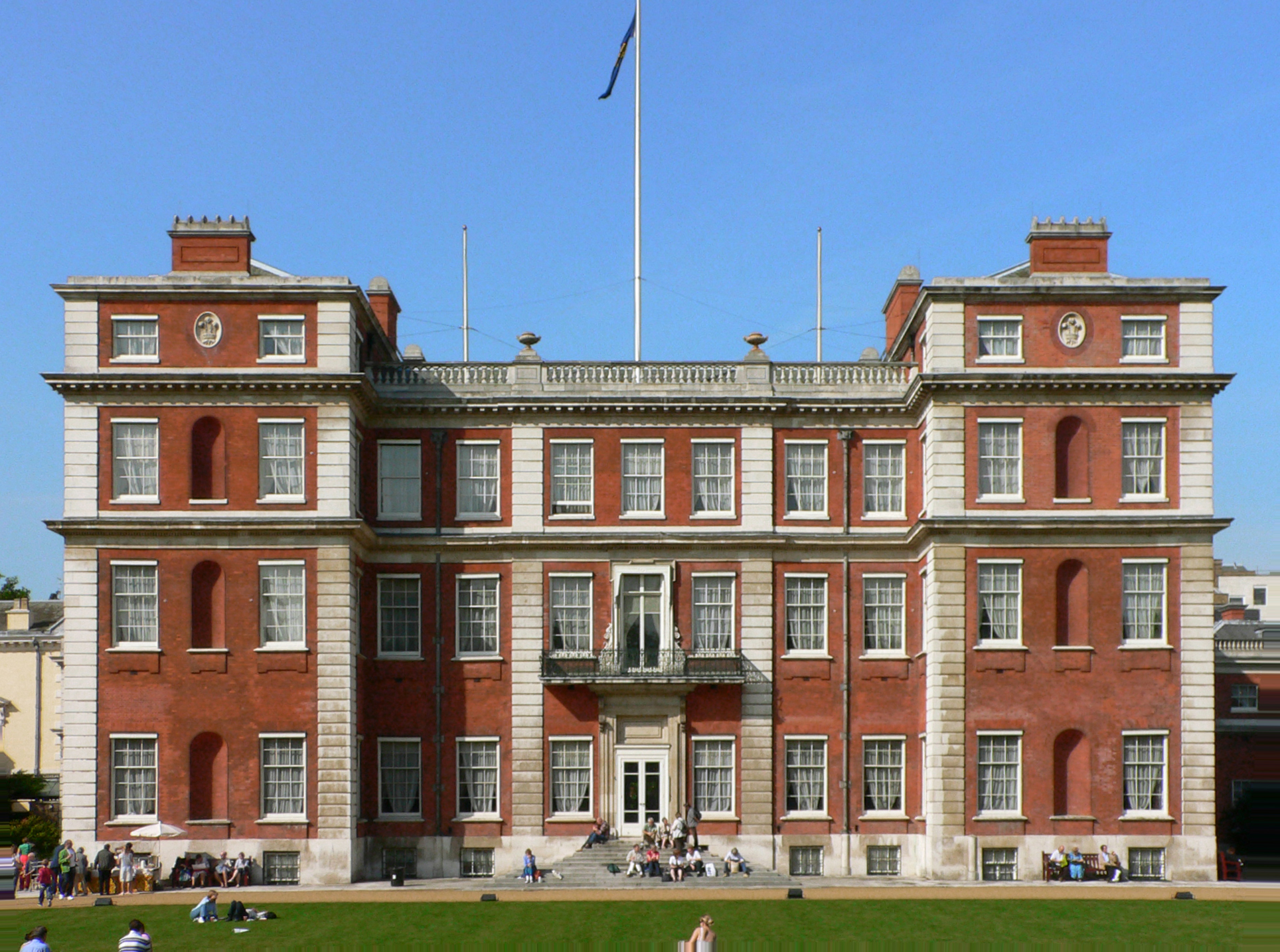
Marlborough House, London, the headquarters of the Commonwealth Secretariat, the Commonwealth's principal intergovernmental institution

The Commonwealth Secretariat, established in 1965, is the main intergovernmental agency of the Commonwealth, facilitating consultation and co-operation among member governments and countries. It is responsible to member governments collectively. The Commonwealth of Nations is represented in the United Nations General Assembly by the Secretariat as an observer. The secretariat organises Commonwealth summits, meetings of ministers, consultative meetings and technical discussions; it assists policy development and provides policy advice, and facilitates multilateral communication among the member governments. It also provides technical assistance to help governments in the social and economic development of their countries and in support of the Commonwealth's fundamental political values.

The secretariat is headed by the Commonwealth secretary-general, who is elected by the CHOG for no more than two four-year terms. Two deputy secretaries-general assist. The present secretary-general is Shirley Ayorkor Botchwey, from Ghana, succeeding Patricia Scotland. The first secretary-general was Arnold Smith of Canada (1965–1975), followed by Sir Shridath Ramphal of Guyana (1975–1990), Chief Emeka Anyaoku of Nigeria (1990–1999), Don McKinnon of New Zealand (2000–2008), and Kamalesh Sharma of India (2008–2016).

=== Commonwealth citizenship and high commissioners ===
Some member states grant particular rights to Commonwealth citizens. The United Kingdom and several others, mostly in the Caribbean, grant the right to vote to resident Commonwealth citizens. Some countries, including the United Kingdom, have preferential citizenship acquisition or residency policies for Commonwealth citizens. Initially, Commonwealth countries were not considered to be "foreign" to each other as their citizens were British subjects. Citizenship laws evolved as the Commonwealth developed from the Empire. In Australia, for the purpose of considering certain constitutional and legal provisions in the High Court case of Sue v Hill, the United Kingdom was held to be a "foreign power". Similarly, in Nolan v Minister for Immigration and Ethnic Affairs, the nationals of other Commonwealth realms were held to be "aliens" though they were subjects of the Queen.

Commonwealth citizens may receive consular assistance from other Commonwealth countries. In particular, British embassies and consulates may provide assistance to Commonwealth nationals in non-Commonwealth countries if their own country is not represented. Commonwealth citizens are eligible to apply for British emergency passports. Australia issues Documents of Identity in exceptional circumstances to resident Commonwealth citizens who are unable to obtain valid travel documents from their countries of origin and must travel urgently.

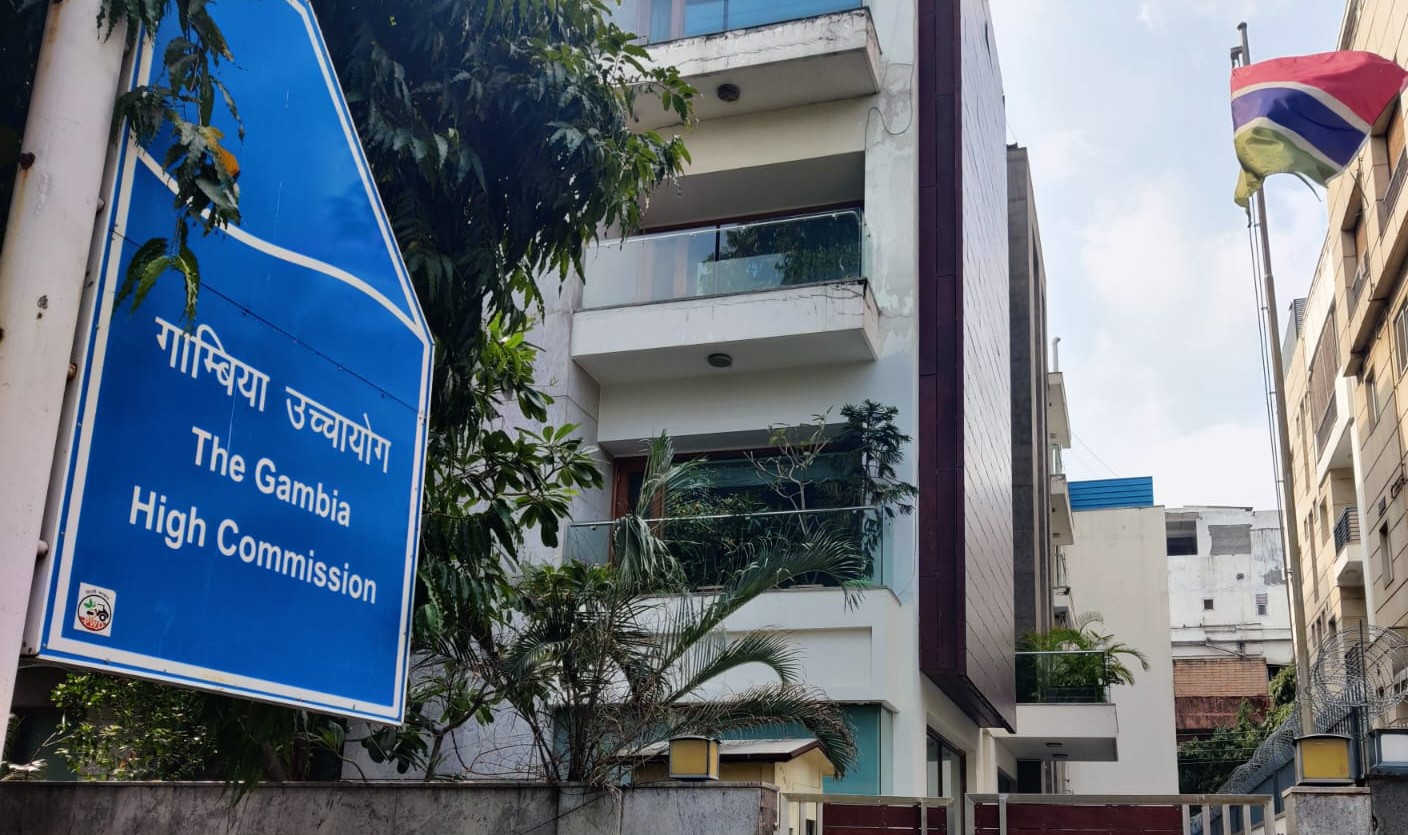
The high commission of The Gambia in New Delhi

The close association among Commonwealth countries is reflected in their diplomatic protocols. For example, when engaging bilaterally with one another, Commonwealth governments exchange high commissioners instead of ambassadors.

==== Commonwealth personnel in the British Armed Forces ====
Commonwealth citizens are eligible to serve in the British Armed Forces. According to the British Army, "Commonwealth soldiers are, and always will be, an important and valued part" of its fabric. Visa fees for Commonwealth personnel seeking to settle in Britain were scrapped in 2022.

== Membership ==
The members of the Commonwealth shaded according to their political status. Commonwealth realms are shown in blue, while republics are shaded pink, and members with their own monarchies are displayed in green.

=== Criteria ===
The criteria for membership of the Commonwealth of Nations have developed over time from a series of separate documents. The Statute of Westminster 1931, as a fundamental founding document of the organisation, laid out that membership required dominionhood. The 1949 London Declaration ended this, allowing republican and indigenous monarchic members on the condition that they recognised King George VI as "Head of the Commonwealth". In the wake of the wave of decolonisation in the 1960s, these constitutional principles were augmented by political, economic, and social principles. The first of these was set out in 1961, when it was decided that respect for racial equality would be a requirement for membership, leading directly to the withdrawal of South Africa's re-application (which they were required to make under the formula of the London Declaration upon becoming a republic). The 14 points of the 1971 Singapore Declaration dedicated all members to the principles of world peace, liberty, human rights, equality, and free trade.

These criteria were unenforceable for two decades, until, in 1991, the Harare Declaration was issued, dedicating the leaders to applying the Singapore principles to the completion of decolonisation, the end of the Cold War, and the end of apartheid in South Africa. The mechanisms by which these principles would be applied were created, and the manner clarified, by the 1995 Millbrook Commonwealth Action Programme, which created the Commonwealth Ministerial Action Group (CMAG), which has the power to rule on whether members meet the requirements for membership under the Harare Declaration. Also in 1995, an Inter-Governmental Group was created to finalise and codify the full requirements for membership. Upon reporting in 1997, as adopted under the Edinburgh Declaration, the Inter-Governmental Group ruled that any future members would "as a rule" have to have a direct constitutional link with an existing member.

In addition to this new rule, the former rules were consolidated into a single document. These requirements are that members must accept and comply with the Harare principles, be fully sovereign states, recognise King Charles III as head of the Commonwealth, accept the English language as the means of Commonwealth communication, and respect the wishes of the general population with regard to Commonwealth membership. These requirements had undergone review, and a report on potential amendments was presented by the Committee on Commonwealth Membership at the 2007 Commonwealth Heads of Government Meeting. New members were not admitted at this meeting, though applications for admission were considered at the 2009 CHOGM.

New members must "as a general rule" have a direct constitutional link to an existing member. In most cases, this is due to being a former colony of the United Kingdom, but some have links to other countries, either exclusively or more directly (e.g., Bangladesh to Pakistan, Samoa to New Zealand, Papua New Guinea to Australia, and Singapore to Malaysia). Mozambique, in 1995, was the first country to join without such a constitutional connection, leading to the Edinburgh Declaration and the current membership guidelines.

In 2009, Rwanda, formerly under Belgian and German rule, joined. Consideration for Rwanda's admission was considered an "exceptional circumstance" by the Commonwealth Secretariat. Rwanda was permitted to join despite the Commonwealth Human Rights Initiative (CHRI) finding that "the state of governance and human rights in Rwanda does not satisfy Commonwealth standards", and that it "does not therefore qualify for admission". The CHRI commented that: "It does not make sense to admit a state that already does not satisfy Commonwealth standards. This would tarnish the reputation of the Commonwealth and confirm the opinion of many people and civic organisations that the leaders of its governments do not really care for democracy and human rights, and that its periodic, solemn declarations are merely hot air."

In 2022, the former French territories of Togo and Gabon joined the Commonwealth.

=== Members ===
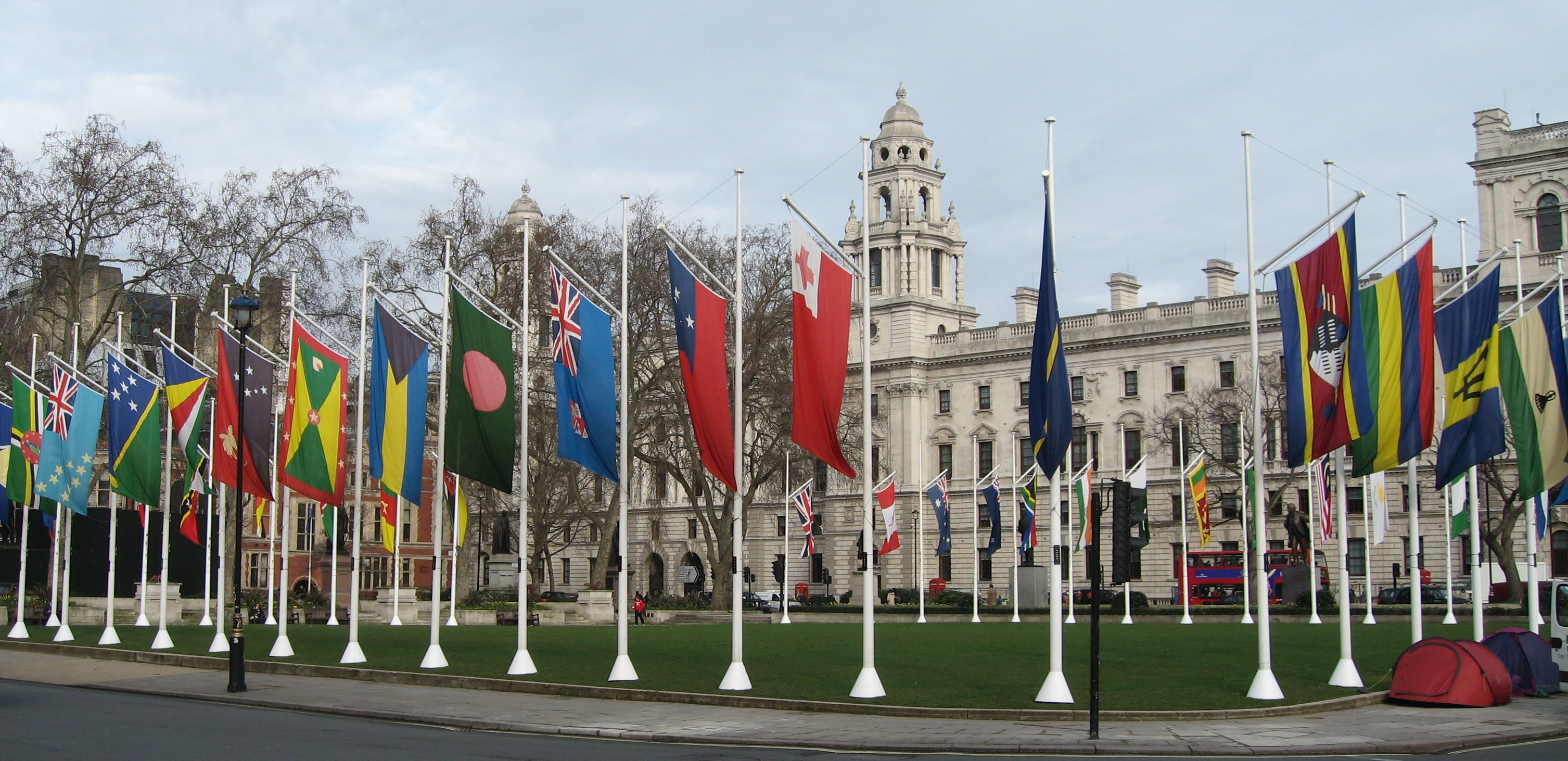
Flags of the Commonwealth countries in Parliament Square, London on Commonwealth Day

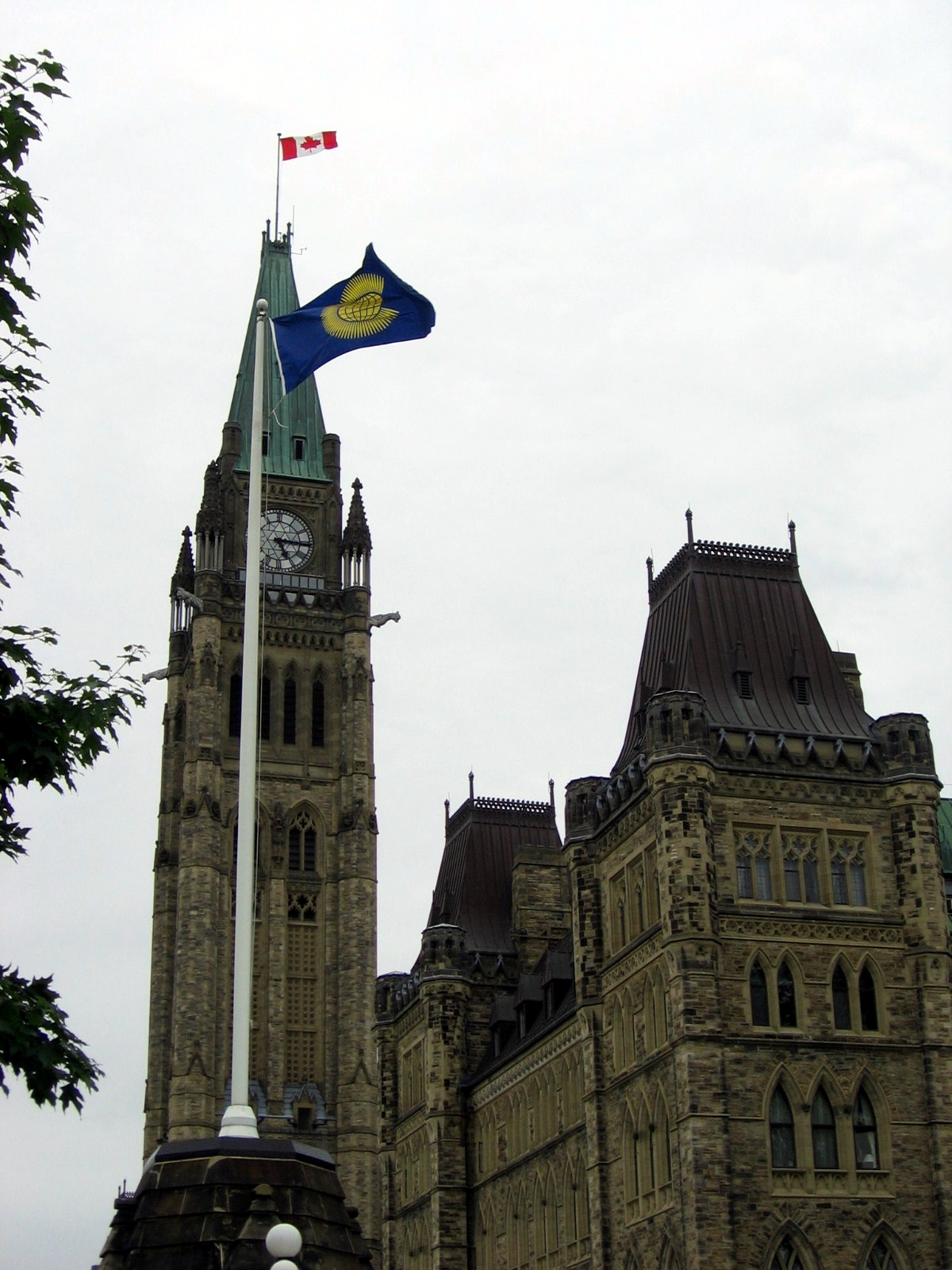
The Commonwealth flag flying at the Parliament of Canada in Ottawa

The Commonwealth comprises 56 countries, across all inhabited continents. 33 members are small states, including 25 small island developing states. In 2023, the Commonwealth had a population of 2.5 billion. The Commonwealth is the largest association of 'Third World' or 'Global South' countries.

With a population of 1.4 billion in 2023, India is the most populous Commonwealth country. Tuvalu is the smallest member, with about 12,000 people in that year.

The status of "member in arrears" is used to denote those that are in arrears in paying subscription dues. The status was originally known as "special membership", but was renamed on the Committee on Commonwealth Membership's recommendation. There are currently no members in arrears. The last member in arrears, Nauru, returned to full membership in June 2011. Nauru previously alternated between special and full membership since joining the Commonwealth, depending on its financial situation.

=== Economy of member countries ===
In 2019, the Commonwealth members had a combined gross domestic product of over $9 trillion, 78 per cent of which is accounted for by the four largest economies: India ($3.737 trillion), United Kingdom ($3.124 trillion), Canada ($1.652 trillion), and Australia ($1.379 trillion).

=== Applicants ===
In 1997 the Commonwealth Heads of Government agreed that, to become a member of the Commonwealth, an applicant country should, as a rule, have had a constitutional association with an existing Commonwealth member; that it should comply with Commonwealth values, principles and priorities as set out in the Harare Declaration; and that it should accept Commonwealth norms and conventions.

South Sudanese politicians have expressed interest in joining the Commonwealth. A senior Commonwealth source stated in 2006 that "many people have assumed an interest from Israel, but there has been no formal approach". Israel and Palestine are both potential candidates for membership.

President Yahya Jammeh unilaterally withdrew the Gambia from the Commonwealth in October 2013. However, newly elected president Adama Barrow returned the country to the organisation in February 2018.

Other eligible applicants could be any of the remaining inhabited British Overseas Territories, Crown Dependencies, Australian external territories and the Associated States of New Zealand if they become fully independent. Many such jurisdictions are already directly represented within the Commonwealth, particularly through the Commonwealth Family. There are also former British possessions that have not become independent. Although Hong Kong has become part of China, it continues to participate in some of the institutions within the Commonwealth Family, including the Commonwealth Lawyers Association, the Association of Commonwealth Universities, the Commonwealth Association of Legislative Counsel and the Commonwealth War Graves Commission (CWGC).

All three of the Crown dependencies regard their existing situation as unsatisfactory and have lobbied for change. In 2012, the States of Jersey called on the UK foreign secretary to request that the Commonwealth heads of government "consider granting associate membership to Jersey and the other Crown Dependencies as well as any other territories at a similarly advanced stage of autonomy". Jersey proposed that it be accorded "self-representation in all Commonwealth meetings; full participation in debates and procedures, with a right to speak where relevant and the opportunity to enter into discussions with those who are full members; and no right to vote in the Ministerial or Heads of Government meetings, which is reserved for full members". The States of Guernsey and the Government of the Isle of Man made calls of a similar nature in the same year for a more integrated relationship with the Commonwealth, including more direct representation and enhanced participation in Commonwealth organisations and meetings, including Commonwealth Heads of Government Meetings. The Chief Minister of the Isle of Man said that a "closer connection with the Commonwealth itself would be a welcome further development of the Island's international relationships".

=== Suspension ===
Members can be suspended "from the Councils of the Commonwealth" for "serious or persistent violations" of the Harare Declaration, particularly in abrogating their responsibility to have democratic government. Suspensions are agreed by the Commonwealth Ministerial Action Group (CMAG), which meets regularly to address potential breaches of the Harare Declaration. Suspended members are not represented at meetings of Commonwealth leaders and ministers, although they remain members of the organisation.

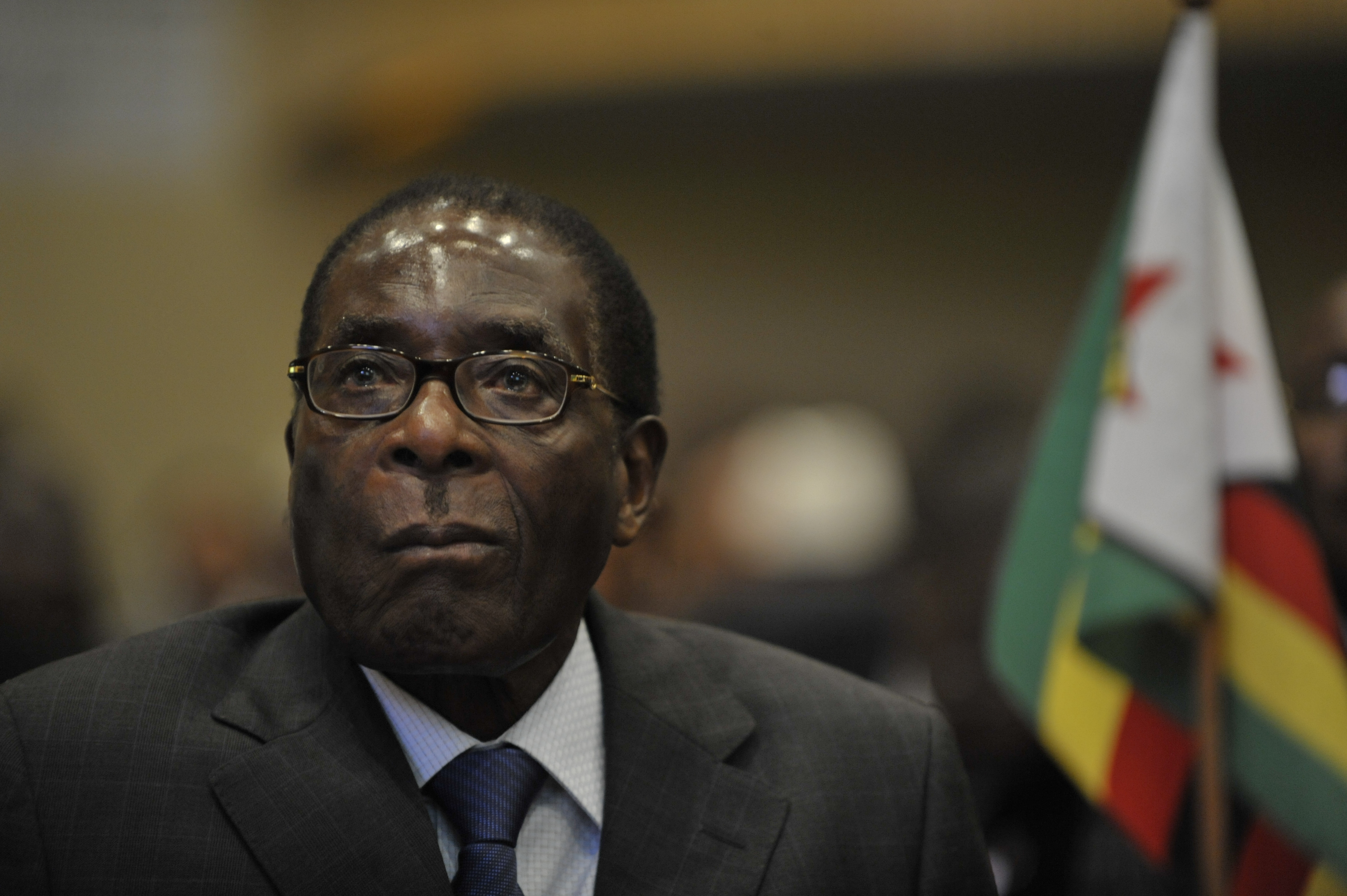
Zimbabwe was suspended from the Commonwealth during Robert Mugabe's presidency, subsequently withdrawing. It applied to rejoin after his removal from power.

Nigeria was suspended between 11 November 1995 and 29 May 1999, following its execution of Ken Saro-Wiwa on the eve of the 1995 CHOGM. Pakistan was the second country to be suspended, on 18 October 1999, following the military coup by Pervez Musharraf. The Commonwealth's longest suspension came to an end on 22 May 2004, when Pakistan's suspension was lifted following the restoration of the country's constitution. Pakistan was suspended for a second time, far more briefly, for six months from 22 November 2007, when Musharraf called a state of emergency. Zimbabwe was suspended in 2002 over concerns regarding the electoral and land reform policies of Robert Mugabe's ZANU-PF government, before it withdrew from the organisation in 2003. On 15 May 2018, the country applied to rejoin the Commonwealth. Zimbabweans continue to be recognised as Commonwealth citizens in Britain.

The declaration of a Republic in Fiji in 1987, after military coups designed to deny Indo-Fijians political power, was not accompanied by an application to remain. Commonwealth membership was held to have lapsed until 1997, after discriminatory provisions in the republican constitution were repealed and reapplication for membership made. Fiji has since been suspended twice, with the first imposed from 6 June 2000 to 20 December 2001 after another coup. Fiji was suspended yet again in December 2006, following the most recent coup. At first, the suspension applied only to membership on the Councils of the Commonwealth. After failing to meet a Commonwealth deadline for setting a date for national elections by 2010, Fiji was "fully suspended" on 1 September 2009. The secretary-general of the Commonwealth, Kamalesh Sharma, confirmed that full suspension meant that Fiji would be excluded from Commonwealth meetings, sporting events and the technical assistance programme (with an exception for assistance in re-establishing democracy). Sharma stated that Fiji would remain a member of the Commonwealth during its suspension, but would be excluded from emblematic representation by the secretariat. On 19 March 2014 Fiji's full suspension was amended to a suspension from councils of the Commonwealth by the Commonwealth Ministerial Action Group, permitting Fiji to join a number of Commonwealth activities, including the Commonwealth Games. Fiji's suspension was lifted in September 2014. The Commonwealth Ministerial Action Group fully reinstated Fiji as a member following elections in September 2014.

Most recently, during 2013 and 2014, international pressure mounted to suspend Sri Lanka from the Commonwealth, citing grave human rights violations by the government of President Mahinda Rajapaksa. There were also calls to change the Commonwealth Heads of Government Meeting 2013 from Sri Lanka to another member country. Canadian prime minister Stephen Harper threatened to boycott the event, but was instead represented at the meeting by Deepak Obhrai. UK prime minister David Cameron also chose to attend. These concerns were rendered moot by the election of opposition leader Maithripala Sirisena as president in 2015.

=== Withdrawal and termination ===
As membership is purely voluntary, member governments can choose at any time to leave the Commonwealth. The first state to do so was Ireland in 1949 following its decision to declare itself a republic, although it had not participated in the Commonwealth since 1932. At the time, all members accepted the British monarch as head of state as a condition of membership. This rule was changed after Ireland's departure to allow India to retain membership when it became a republic in 1950, although Ireland did not rejoin. Now, the majority of the Commonwealth members, including all those from Africa, are republics or have their own native monarch.

Pakistan left on 30 January 1972 in protest at the Commonwealth's recognition of breakaway Bangladesh, but rejoined on 2 August 1989. Zimbabwe's membership was suspended in 2002 on the grounds of alleged human rights violations and deliberate misgovernment, and Zimbabwe's government terminated its membership in 2003. The Gambia left the Commonwealth on 3 October 2013, and rejoined on 8 February 2018.

The Maldives withdrew from the Commonwealth on 13 October 2016, citing the Commonwealth's "punitive actions against the Maldives since 2012" after the allegedly forced resignation of Maldivian President Mohamed Nasheed among the reasons for withdrawal. Following the election of Ibrahim Mohamed Solih as president in November 2018, the Maldives announced its intention to reapply to join the Commonwealth. It rejoined on 1 February 2020.

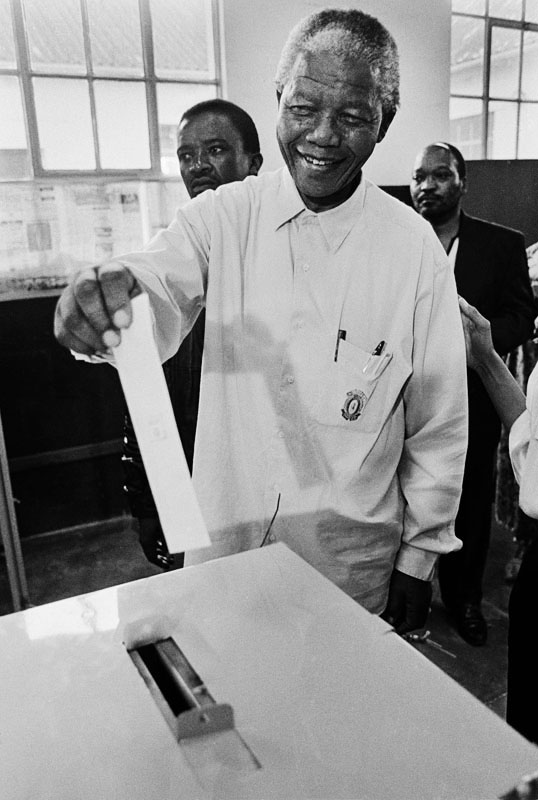
Having left the Commonwealth in 1961 over its apartheid policies, South Africa was readmitted in 1994 following non-racial elections.

No country has been formally expelled from the Commonwealth. However, South Africa's application to remain a member of the organisation after becoming a republic in 1961 was effectively blocked due to hostility from many members, particularly those in Africa and Asia as well as Canada, to apartheid. The South African government withdrew its application when it became clear at the 1961 Commonwealth Prime Ministers' Conference that it would be rejected. South Africa was re-admitted to the Commonwealth in 1994, following its first multiracial elections that year. The Commonwealth provided technical assistance and training for a peacekeeping force prior to election, with Commonwealth observers significantly present during the election itself.

The transfer of sovereignty over Hong Kong in 1997 ended the territory's status as a part of the Commonwealth through the United Kingdom. Non-sovereign states or regions are not permitted to become members of the Commonwealth. The government of China has not pursued membership. Hong Kong has nevertheless continued to participate in some of the organisations of the Commonwealth Family, such as the Commonwealth Lawyers Association (hosted the Commonwealth Lawyers Conference in 1983 and 2009), the Commonwealth Parliamentary Association (and the Westminster Seminar on Parliamentary Practice and Procedures), the Association of Commonwealth Universities and the Commonwealth Association of Legislative Counsel, as well as the Commonwealth War Graves Commission (CWGC).

== Politics ==
=== Objectives and activities ===
The Commonwealth's objectives were first outlined in the 1971 Singapore Declaration, which committed the Commonwealth to the institution of world peace; promotion of representative democracy and individual liberty; the pursuit of equality and opposition to racism; the fight against poverty, ignorance, and disease; and free trade. To these were added opposition to discrimination on the basis of sex by the Lusaka Declaration of 1979, and environmental sustainability by the Langkawi Declaration of 1989. These objectives were reinforced by the Harare Declaration in 1991.

The Commonwealth's highest-priority aims concern the promotion of democracy and development, as outlined in the 2003 Aso Rock Declaration, which built on those in Singapore and Harare and clarified their terms of reference, stating, "We are committed to democracy, good governance, human rights, gender equality, and a more equitable sharing of the benefits of globalisation."

=== Competence ===
In October 2010, a leaked memo from the Secretary General instructing staff not to speak out on human rights was published, leading to accusations that the Commonwealth was not being vocal enough on its core values.

The Commonwealth Heads of Government Meeting 2011 considered a report by a Commonwealth Eminent Persons Group (EPG) panel which asserted that the organisation had lost its relevance and was decaying due to the lack of a mechanism to censure member countries when they violated human rights or democratic norms. The panel made 106 "urgent" recommendations including the adoption of a Charter of the Commonwealth, the creation of a new commissioner on the rule of law, democracy and human rights to track persistent human rights abuses and allegations of political repression by Commonwealth member states, recommendations for the repeal of laws against homosexuality in 41 Commonwealth states and a ban on forced marriage. The failure to release the report, or accept its recommendations for reforms in the area of human rights, democracy and the rule of law, was described as a "disgrace" by former British foreign secretary Malcolm Rifkind, a member of the EPG, who told a press conference: "The Commonwealth faces a very significant problem. It's not a problem of hostility or antagonism, it's more of a problem of indifference. Its purpose is being questioned, its relevance is being questioned and part of that is because its commitment to enforce the values for which it stands is becoming ambiguous in the eyes of many member states. The Commonwealth is not a private club of the governments or the secretariat. It belongs to the people of the Commonwealth."

In the end, two-thirds of the EPG's 106 urgently recommended reforms were referred to study groups, an act described by one EPG member as having them "kicked into the long grass". There was no agreement to create the recommended position of human rights commissioner, instead a ministerial management group was empowered with enforcement: the group includes alleged human rights offenders. It was agreed to develop a charter of values for the Commonwealth without any decision on how compliance with its principles would be enforced.

The result of the effort was that a new Charter of the Commonwealth was signed by Queen Elizabeth II on 11 March 2013 at Marlborough House, which opposes "all forms of discrimination, whether rooted in gender, race, colour, creed, political belief or other grounds".

== Economy ==
=== Economic data by member ===
Economies of the Commonwealth of Nations 2012

Member states	Population (2021)	GDP (nominal, US$)		GDP (PPP, US$)	
Member states	Population (2021)	millions	per capita	millions	per capita
Antigua and Barbuda	93,219	1,176	12,480	1,778	18,492
Australia	25,921,089	1,520,608	61,789	1,008,547	41,974
Bahamas	407,906	8,149	22,431	11,765	31,978
Bangladesh	169,356,251	115,610	743	291,299	1,777
Barbados	281,200	3,685	13,453	—	—
Belize	400,031	1,448	4,059	2,381	6,672
Botswana	2,588,423	14,411	8,533	34,038	14,746
Brunei	445,373	16,954	40,301	21,992	51,760
Cameroon	27,198,628	24,984	1,260	50,820	2,359
Canada	38,155,012	1,821,424	50,344	1,489,165	40,420
Cyprus	1,244,188	22,981	30,670	26,720	32,254
Dominica	72,412	480	7,154	906	13,288
Eswatini	1,192,271	3,747	3,831	6,458	6,053
Ghana	32,833,031	40,710	1,570	51,943	1,871
Grenada	124,610	790	7,780	1,142	10,837
Guyana	804,567	2,851	3,408	2,704	—
India	1,407,563,842	3,732,224	2,171	11,468,022	7,874
Jamaica	2,827,695	14,840	5,335	—	—
Kenya	53,005,614	37,229	808	76,016	1,710
Kiribati	128,874	176	1,649	248	2,337
Lesotho	2,281,454	2,448	1,106	4,027	1,691
Malawi	19,889,742	4,264	365	14,344	893
Malaysia	33,573,874	303,526	9,977	501,249	16,051
Maldives	521,457	2,222	6,405	3,070	8,871
Malta	526,748	8,722	21,380	12,138	27,504
Mauritius	1,298,915	10,492	8,755	20,210	14,420
Mozambique	32,077,072	14,588	533	25,805	975
Namibia	2,530,151	12,807	5,383	16,918	6,801
Nauru	12,511	—	—	—	—
New Zealand	5,129,727	139,768	36,254	139,640	31,082
Nigeria	213,401,323	262,606	1,502	449,289	2,533
Pakistan	231,402,117	231,182	1,189	517,873	2,745
Papua New Guinea	9,949,437	15,654	1,845	20,771	2,676
Rwanda	13,461,888	7,103	8,874	15,517	1,282
Saint Kitts and Nevis	47,606	748	13,144	966	17,226
Saint Lucia	179,651	1,186	7,154	2,016	11,597
Saint Vincent and the Grenadines	104,332	713	6,291	1,202	10,715
Samoa	218,764	677	3,485	853	4,475
Seychelles	106,471	1,032	12,321	2,371	25,788
Sierra Leone	8,420,641	3,796	496	8,125	1,131
Singapore	5,941,060	274,701	46,241	328,323	60,688
Solomon Islands	707,851	1,008	1,517	1,718	2,923
South Africa	59,392,255	384,313	8,070	585,625	10,960
Sri Lanka	21,773,441	59,421	2,835	126,993	5,582
Tanzania	63,588,334	28,249	532	74,269	1,512
Tonga	106,017	472	4,152	527	4,886
Trinidad and Tobago	1,525,663	23,986	16,699	35,638	25,074
Tuvalu	11,204	37	3,636	—	—
Uganda	45,853,778	19,881	487	49,130	1,345
United Kingdom	67,281,039	3,124,650	38,974	3,174,921	35,598
Vanuatu	319,137	785	3,094	1,139	4,379
Zambia	19,473,125	20,678	1,425	24,096	1,621
Commonwealth	2,418,964,000	9,766,209	3,844	13,119,929	4,035

=== Postwar ===
During the Second World War, the British Empire played a major role in supporting British finances. Foreign exchange reserves were pooled in London, to be used to fight the war. In effect, the United Kingdom procured £2.3 billion, of which £1.3 billion was from British India. The debt was held in the form of British government securities and became known as "sterling balances". By 1950, India, Pakistan, and Ceylon had spent much of their sterling, while other countries accumulated more. The sterling area included all of the Commonwealth except for Canada, together with some smaller countries especially in the Persian Gulf. They held their foreign-exchange in sterling, protecting that currency from runs and facilitating trade and investment inside the Commonwealth. It was a formal relationship with fixed exchange rates, periodic meetings at Commonwealth summits to coordinate trade policy, and domestic economic policies. The United Kingdom ran a trade surplus, and the other countries were mostly producers of raw materials sold to the United Kingdom. The commercial rationale was gradually less attractive to the Commonwealth; however, access to the growing London capital market remained an important advantage to the newly independent nations. As the United Kingdom moved increasingly close to Europe, however, the long-term ties began to be in doubt.

==== UK joins the European Economic Community ====
By 1961, with a sluggish economy, the United Kingdom attempted to join the European Economic Community, but this was repeatedly vetoed by Charles de Gaulle. Entry was finally achieved in 1973. Queen Elizabeth was one of the few remaining links between the UK and the Commonwealth. Historian Ben Pimlott argues that joining Europe "constituted the most decisive step yet in the progress of severance of familial ties between the United Kingdom and its former Empire... It reduced the remaining links to sentimental and cultural ones, and legal niceties."

The newly independent countries of Africa and Asia concentrated on their own internal political and economic development, and sometimes their role in the Cold War. The United States, international agencies, and the Soviet Union became important players, and the British role receded. While there was opposition to British entry into the EEC from many countries, such as Australia, others preferred the economic advantages brought by British access to the Common Market. The historic ties between the former dominion nations and the United Kingdom were rapidly fraying. The Canadian economy increasingly focused on trade with the United States, and not on trade with the United Kingdom or other Commonwealth nations. Internal Canadian disputes revolved around the growing American cultural and economic presence, and the strong force of Quebec nationalism. In 1964, the Maple Leaf flag replaced the Canadian Ensign, with Gregory Johnson describing it as "the last gasp of empire". Australia and New Zealand were generally opposed to the United Kingdom's entry and exerted considerable influence on the eventual terms of accession in 1972, for which the United Kingdom agreed to transitional arrangements and monetary compensation to protect important export markets. Russell Ward summarises the period in economic terms:

In fact the United Kingdom, as Australia's chief trading partner, was being very rapidly replaced just at this time by the United States and an economically resurgent Japan, but most people were scarcely aware of this.... It was feared that British entry into the Common Market was bound to mean abolition, or at least scaling down, of preferential tariff arrangements for Australians goods.

=== Trade ===
Research by the Royal Commonwealth Society in 2010 showed that Commonwealth countries imported 50 per cent more on average from others in the association, and exported an average of 38 per cent more. Smaller and less wealthy countries have a higher propensity to trade within the Commonwealth. In 2024 alone, two years after Togo joined, its trade with Britain increased by 94 per cent. Intra-Commonwealth trade involves lesser transaction costs, as a result of legal and linguistic commonalities — including widespread use of common law — and established business networks.

At the 2005 summit in Malta, the heads of government endorsed pursuing free trade among Commonwealth members on a bilateral basis. In 2025, Commonwealth Secretary-General Shirley Ayorkor Botchwey endorsed the ultimate creation of a Commonwealth free trade area.

Following its vote in June 2016 to leave the European Union, some in the United Kingdom suggested the Commonwealth as an alternative to its EU membership, and the government sought to increase trade within the association. It was far from clear that this would offer sufficient economic benefit to replace trade with the EU, or that it would be acceptable to other member states. Britain's first newly negotiated trade deal was the Australia–United Kingdom Free Trade Agreement, signed in 2021. In 2023, ten per cent of British exports went to the Commonwealth, whilst eight per cent of its imports were from Commonwealth countries; India was the most significant.

Canada exempts most goods from the Commonwealth Caribbean, consisting of Commonwealth countries and British Overseas Territories in the region, from import duties.

== Commonwealth organisations ==
Commonwealth countries share many links outside government, with various non-governmental organisations, notably for sport, culture, education, law, and charity operating across the association. Some, such as Sight Savers International and the English-Speaking Union, also operate outside the Commonwealth, though their operations began and largely remain within.

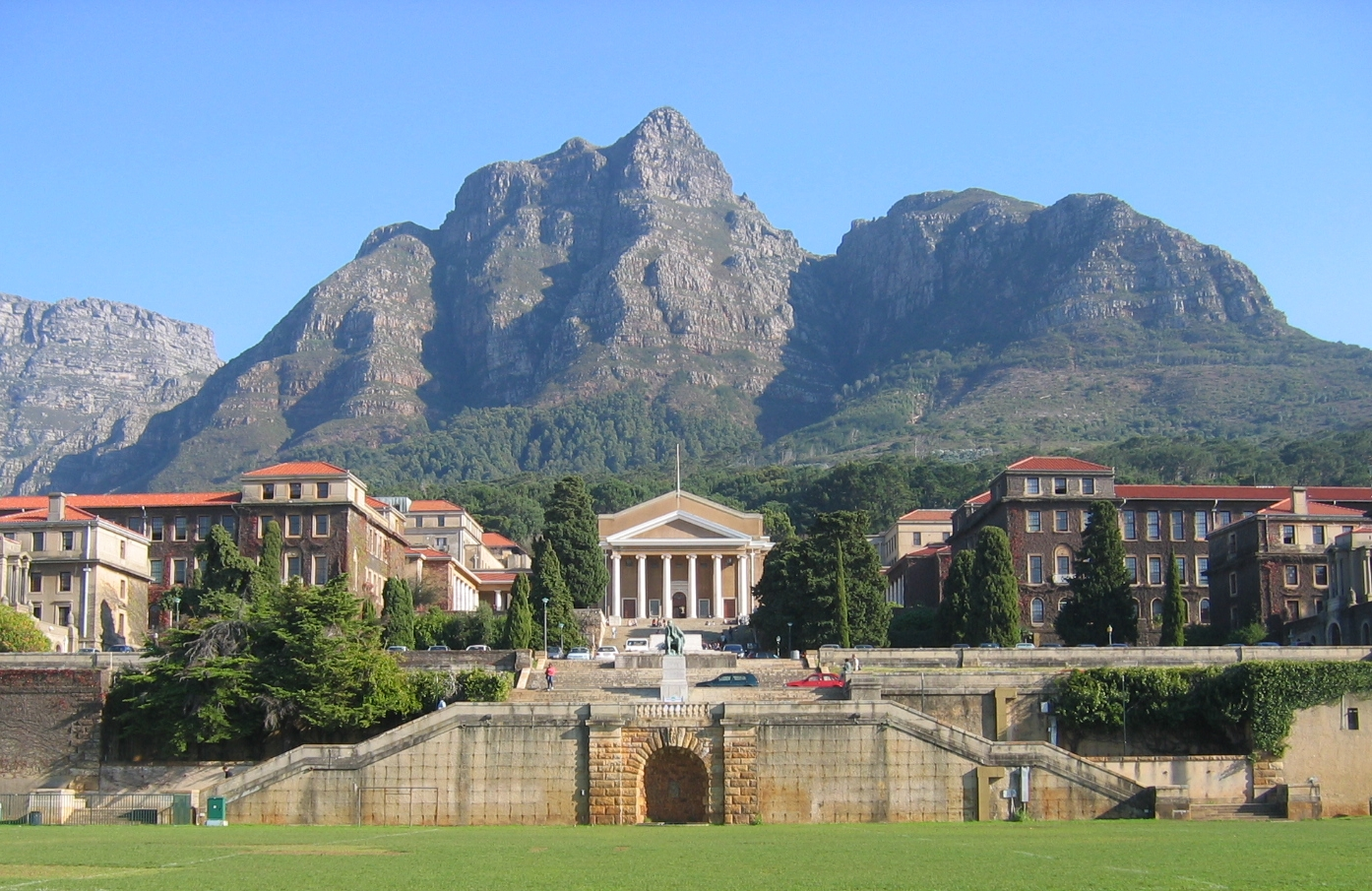
The University of Cape Town, a member of the Association of Commonwealth Universities

The Commonwealth Secretariat regulates formal accreditation with the Commonwealth through its Accreditation Committee. The admittance criteria includes upholding a commitment to the Commonwealth Charter. Formally accredited organisations include the Association of Commonwealth Universities, which manages the Commonwealth Scholarship allowing students to study in other Commonwealth countries, and the Commonwealth Parliamentary Association which links together over 180 Commonwealth parliaments.

=== Commonwealth Foundation ===
The Commonwealth Foundation is an intergovernmental organisation, resourced by and reporting to Commonwealth governments, and guided by Commonwealth values and priorities. Its mandate is to strengthen civil society in the achievement of Commonwealth priorities: democracy and good governance, respect for human rights and gender equality, poverty eradication, people-centred and sustainable development, and to promote arts and culture.

The Foundation was established in 1965 by the Heads of Government. Admittance is open to all members of the Commonwealth, and in December 2008, stood at 46 out of the 53 member countries. Associate Membership, which is open to associated states or overseas territories of member governments, has been granted to Gibraltar. 2005 saw celebrations for the Foundation's 40th Anniversary. The Foundation is headquartered in Marlborough House, Pall Mall, London. Regular liaison and co-operation between the Secretariat and the Foundation is in place. The Foundation continues to serve the broad purposes for which it was established as written in the Memorandum of Understanding.

=== Commonwealth Games ===
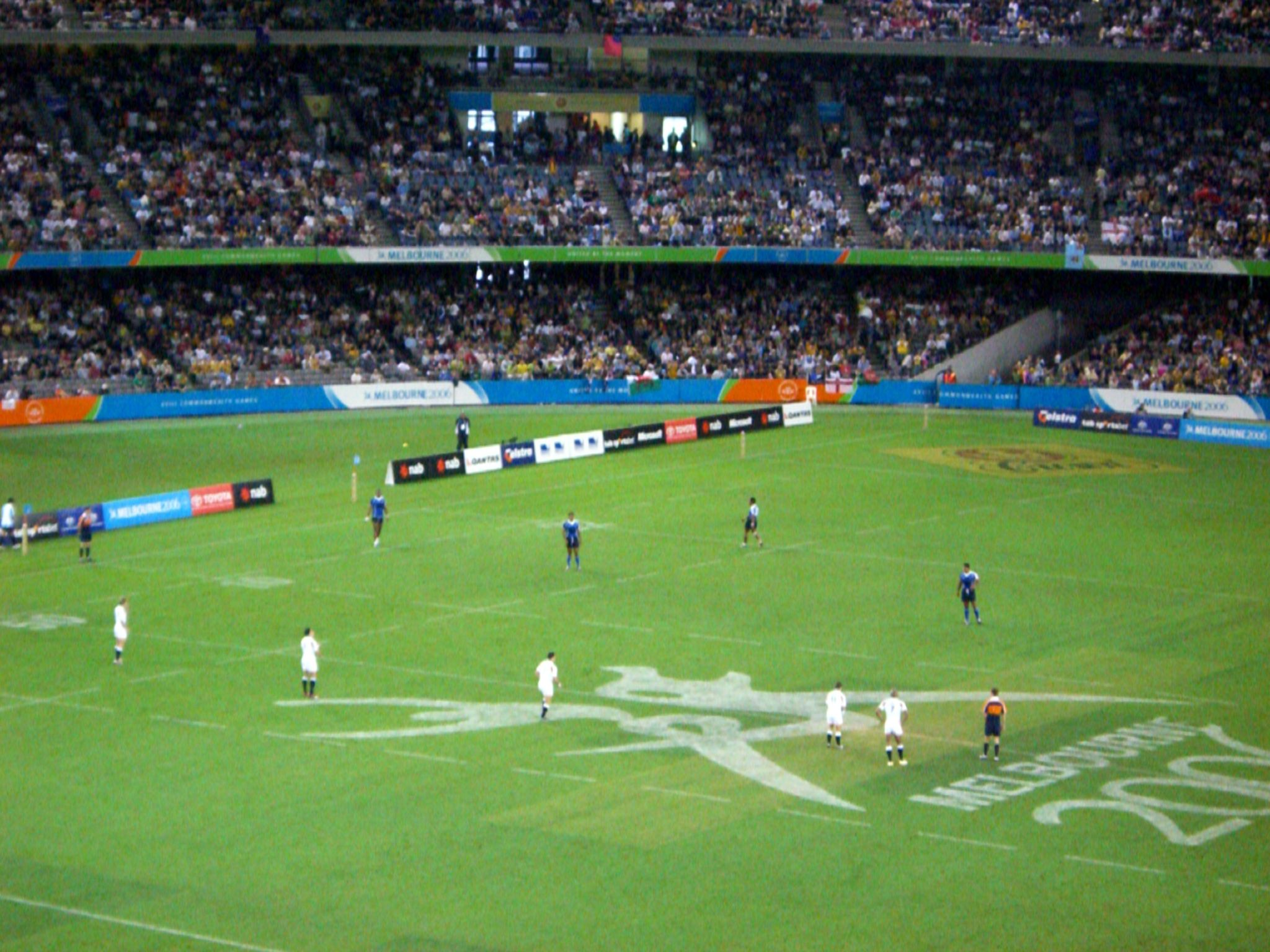
The Commonwealth Games are the third-largest multi-sport event in the world, bringing together globally popular sports and peculiarly "Commonwealth" sports, such as rugby sevens, shown here at the 2006 Games in Melbourne.

The Commonwealth Games, a multi-sport event, is held every four years; the 2018 Commonwealth Games were held in Gold Coast, Australia, 2022 Commonwealth Games in Birmingham and 2026 Commonwealth Games in Glasgow. As well as the usual athletic disciplines, as at the Summer Olympic Games, the games include sports particularly popular in the Commonwealth, such as bowls, netball, and rugby sevens. Started in 1930 as the Empire Games, the games were founded on the Olympic model of amateurism, but were deliberately designed to be "the Friendly Games", with the goal of promoting relations between Commonwealth countries and celebrating their shared sporting and cultural heritage.

The games are the Commonwealth's most visible activity and interest in the operation of the Commonwealth increases greatly when the Games are held. There is controversy over whether the games—and sport generally—should be involved in the Commonwealth's wider political concerns. The 1977 Gleneagles Agreement was signed to commit Commonwealth countries to combat apartheid through discouraging sporting contact with South Africa (which was not then a member), while the 1986 games were boycotted by most African, Asian, and Caribbean countries for the failure of other countries to enforce the Gleneagles Agreement.

=== Commonwealth Youth Games ===
The Commonwealth Youth Games is the youth version of the Commonwealth Games and it is aimed at younger athletes aged between 14 and 18 years. The 2000 Commonwealth Youth Games was the inaugural edition of the Commonwealth Youth Games, first held in Edinburgh, Scotland.

The most recent edition of the games was held in 2023 in Trinidad and Tobago.

=== Commonwealth War Graves Commission ===
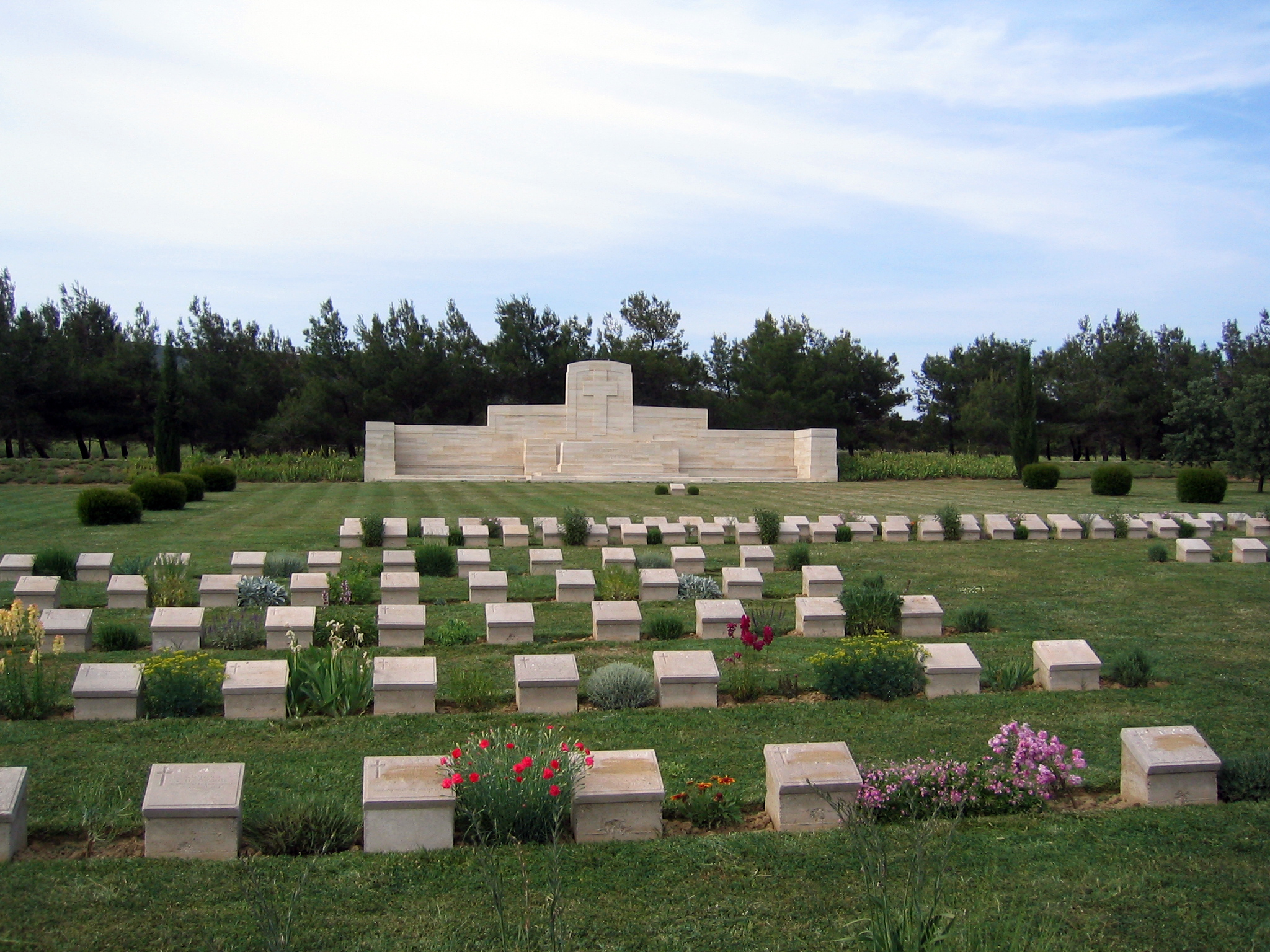
The Commonwealth War Graves Commission commemorates 1.7 million Commonwealth war dead and maintains 2,500 war cemeteries around the world, including this one in Gallipoli.

The Commonwealth War Graves Commission (CWGC) is responsible for maintaining the war graves of 1.7 million service personnel who died in the First and Second World Wars fighting for Commonwealth member states. Founded in 1917 (as the Imperial War Graves Commission), the commission has constructed 2,500 war cemeteries, and maintains individual graves at another 20,000 sites around the world. The vast majority of the latter are civilian cemeteries in the United Kingdom. In 1998, the CWGC made the records of its buried available online to facilitate easier searching.

Commonwealth war cemeteries often feature similar horticulture and architecture, with larger cemeteries being home to a Cross of Sacrifice and Stone of Remembrance. The CWGC is notable for marking the graves identically, regardless of the rank, country of origin, race, or religion of the buried. (Note: Each headstone contains the national emblem or regimental badge, rank, name, unit, date of death and age of each casualty inscribed above an appropriate religious symbol and a more personal dedication chosen by relatives.) It is funded by voluntary agreement by six Commonwealth members, in proportion to the nationality of the casualties in the graves maintained, with 75 per cent of the funding coming from the United Kingdom.

=== Commonwealth of Learning ===
The Commonwealth of Learning (COL) is an intergovernmental organisation created by the heads of government to encourage the development and sharing of open learning/distance education knowledge, resources and technologies. COL is helping developing nations improve access to quality education and training.

=== Commonwealth Local Government Forum ===
The Commonwealth Local Government Forum (CLGF) is a global local government organisation, bringing together local authorities, their national associations and the ministries responsible for local government in the member countries of the Commonwealth. CLGF works with national and local governments to support the development of democratic values and good local governance and is the associated organisation officially recognised by Commonwealth Heads of Government as the representative body for local government in the Commonwealth.

CLGF is unique in bringing together central, provincial and local spheres of government involved in local government policy and decision-making. CLGF members include local government associations, individual local authorities, ministries dealing with local government, and research and professional organisations who work with local government. Practitioner to practitioner support is at the core of CLGF's work across the Commonwealth and within the region, using CLGF's own members to support others both within and between regions. CLGF is a member of the Global Taskforce of Local and Regional Governments, the formal partner of the UN Major Group of Local Authorities.

== Culture ==
Commonwealth countries share a common culture that includes the English language, sports, legal systems, education and government. These commonalities are the result of the association's heritage, having developed out of the British Empire. Symbols of the Commonwealth include the Commonwealth Flag and Commonwealth Day. Remembrance Day is commemorated across the Commonwealth. Festivities for Guy Fawkes Night take place in some countries. Writing about the Commonwealth, Kenyan academic Ali Mazrui asked, "in the ultimate analysis, what could a New Zealander have in common with a Jamaican or a Zambian, if not the bonds of a shared British-ness?"

=== Sport ===
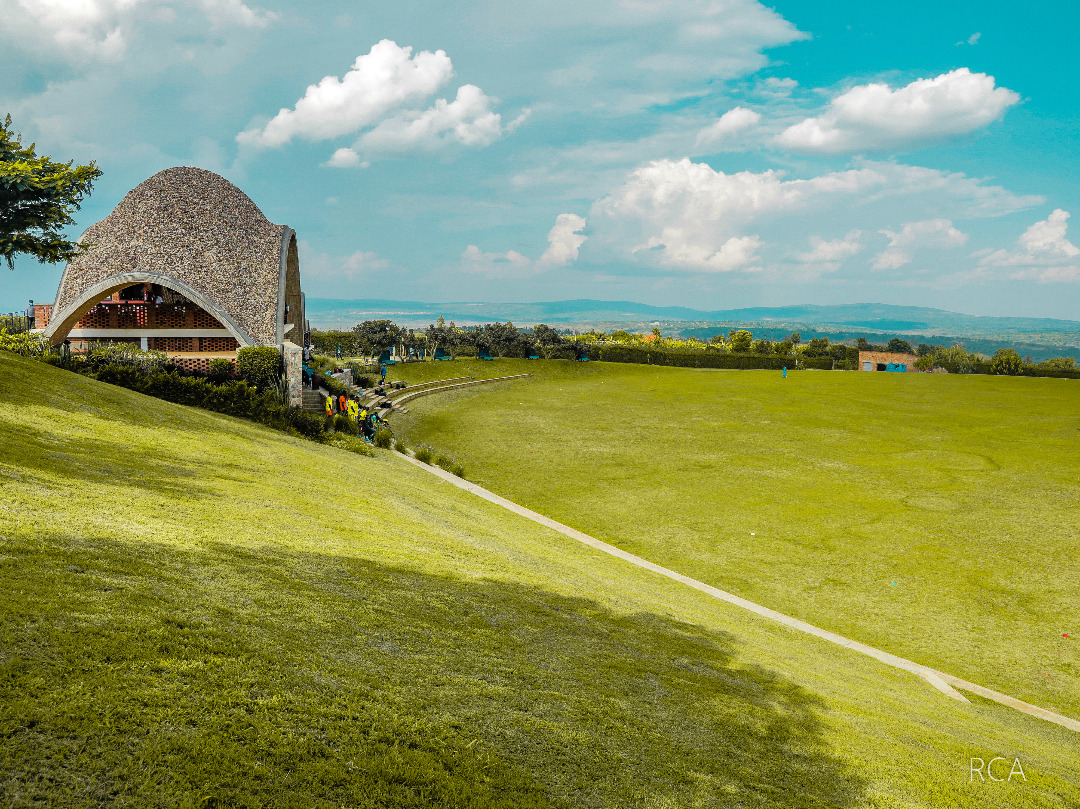
Rwanda Cricket Stadium, Kigali, Rwanda. Commonwealth membership has been credited with popularising the game in the country, which was never in the British Empire.

Many Commonwealth nations play similar sports that are considered quintessentially British in character, rooted in and developed under British rule or hegemony, including cricket, association football, rugby, field hockey and netball. These ties are particularly strong between the United Kingdom, Australia, New Zealand and South Africa across rugby union, cricket, netball, and field hockey, with Australia in rugby league, with the Caribbean nations in cricket and netball, and with the Indian subcontinent in cricket and hockey. Canada, by contrast, is dominated by North American sports, including baseball instead of cricket, basketball rather than netball, ice hockey rather than field hockey and Canadian football, rather than rugby union or league. Canada does, however, maintain small enthusiastic communities in all the more traditional Commonwealth sports, having reached the World Cup in each of them, and is the homeplace of the Commonwealth Games, hosting the inaugural edition in Hamilton in 1930.

This shared sporting landscape has led to the development of friendly national rivalries between the main sporting nations that have often defined their relations with each other, and in the cases of India, Australia and New Zealand, have played a major part in defining their emerging national character (in cricket, rugby league and rugby union). Indeed, said rivalries preserved close ties by providing a constant in international relationships, even as the Empire transformed into the Commonwealth. Externally, playing these sports is seen to be a sign of sharing a certain Commonwealth culture; the adoption of cricket at schools in Rwanda was viewed as symbolic of the country's move towards Commonwealth membership. Rwanda's membership of the Commonwealth was credited with helping to popularise the sport domestically, with both men and women playing it in orphanages, schools, universities and cricket clubs.

The Commonwealth Games alongside the youth version, a quadrennial multi-sports event held in the middle year of an Olympic cycle is the most visible demonstration of these sporting ties. The Games include standard multi-sports disciplines like athletics, swimming, gymnastics, weightlifting, boxing, field hockey, and cycling, but also includes sports popular in the Commonwealth that are distinct to the Games such as netball, squash and lawn bowls. They are also more avowedly political than events like the Olympics, promoting what are seen as Commonwealth values; historically, a history of shared military endeavour was celebrated and promoted, parasport and disability sport is fully integrated, and the Commonwealth Games Federation has publicly backed the rights of LGBT people, despite the continuing criminalisation of homosexuality in many Commonwealth countries.

=== Literature ===
The shared history of British presence has produced a substantial body of writing in many languages, known as Commonwealth literature. The Association for Commonwealth Literature and Language Studies (ACLALS) has 11 branches worldwide and holds an international conference every three years.

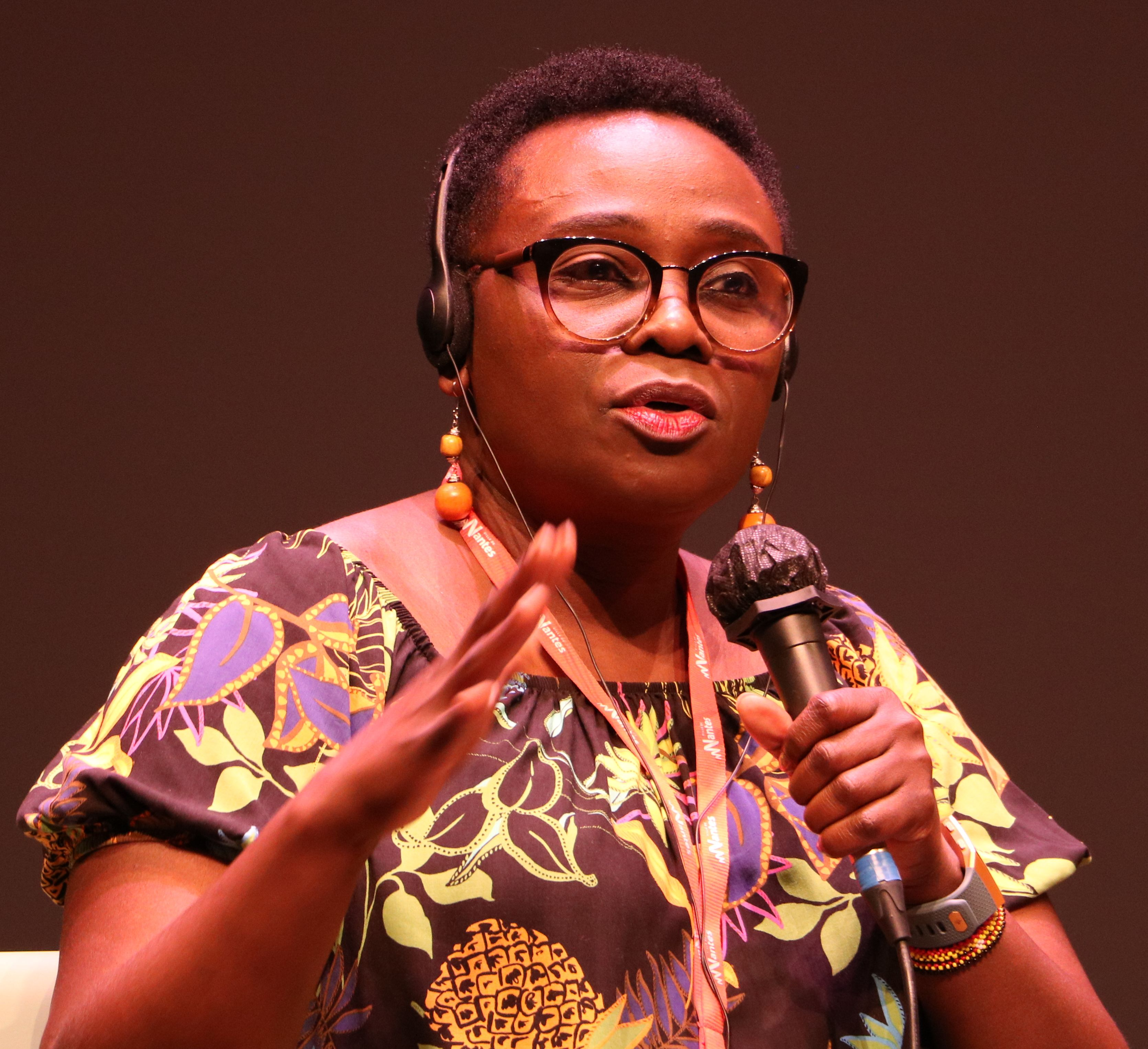
Ugandan-British novelist Jennifer Nansubuga Makumbi won the Commonwealth Short Story Prize in 2014.

In 1987, the Commonwealth Foundation established the annual Commonwealth Writers' Prize "to encourage and reward the upsurge of new Commonwealth fiction and ensure that works of merit reach a wider audience outside their country of origin". Prizes are awarded for the best book and best first book in the Commonwealth; there are also regional prizes for the best book and best first book in each of four regions. Although not officially affiliated with the Commonwealth, the prestigious annual Man Booker Prize, one of the highest honours in literature, used to be awarded only to authors from Commonwealth countries or former members such as Ireland and Zimbabwe. Since 2014, however, writers of any nationality have been eligible for the prize providing that they write originally in English and their novels are published by established publishers in the United Kingdom. Today, the Commonwealth Foundation awards the annual Commonwealth Short Story Prize.

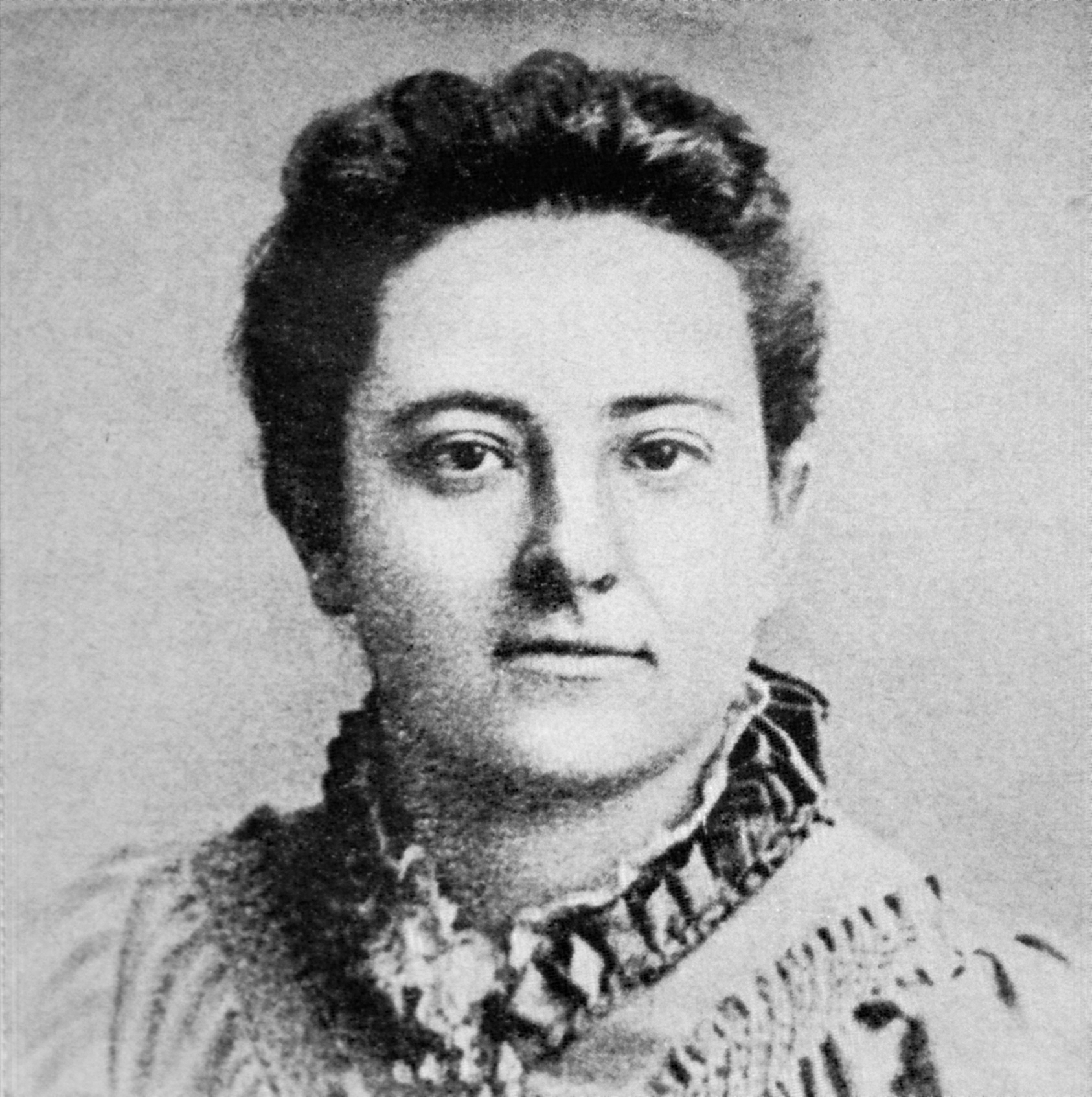
South African writer Olive Schreiner

South African writer Olive Schreiner's famous novel The Story of an African Farm was published in 1883 and New Zealander Katherine Mansfield published her first collection of short stories, In a German Pension, in 1911. The first major novelist from the Indian sub-continent to write in English, R. K. Narayan, began publishing in England in the 1930s, thanks to the encouragement of English novelist Graham Greene. Caribbean writer Jean Rhys' writing career began as early as 1928, though her most famous work, Wide Sargasso Sea, was not published until 1966. South African Alan Paton's famous Cry, the Beloved Country dates to 1948. Doris Lessing from Southern Rhodesia, now Zimbabwe, was a dominant presence in the English literary scene, frequently publishing from 1950 on throughout the 20th century. She won the Nobel Prize in Literature in 2007.

Salman Rushdie is another post-Second World War writer from the former British colonies who permanently settled in the United Kingdom. Rushdie achieved fame with Midnight's Children (1981). His most controversial novel, The Satanic Verses (1989), was inspired in part by the life of Muhammad. V. S. Naipaul (born 1932), born in Trinidad, was another immigrant, who wrote, among other things, A Bend in the River (1979). Naipaul won the Nobel Prize in Literature in 2001.

Many other Commonwealth writers have achieved an international reputation for works in English, including Nigerian novelist Chinua Achebe, and playwright Wole Soyinka. Soyinka won the Nobel Prize in Literature in 1986, as did South African novelist Nadine Gordimer in 1995. Other South African writers in English are novelist J. M. Coetzee (Nobel Prize 2003) and playwright Athol Fugard. Kenya's most internationally renowned author is Ngũgĩ wa Thiong'o, author of novels, plays and short stories in English. Poet Derek Walcott, from Saint Lucia in the Caribbean, was another Nobel Prize winner in 1992. An Australian, Patrick White, a major novelist in this period, whose first work was published in 1939, won in 1973. Other noteworthy Australian writers at the end of this period are poet Les Murray, and novelist Peter Carey, who is one of only four writers to have won the Booker Prize twice.

=== Politics and judiciary ===
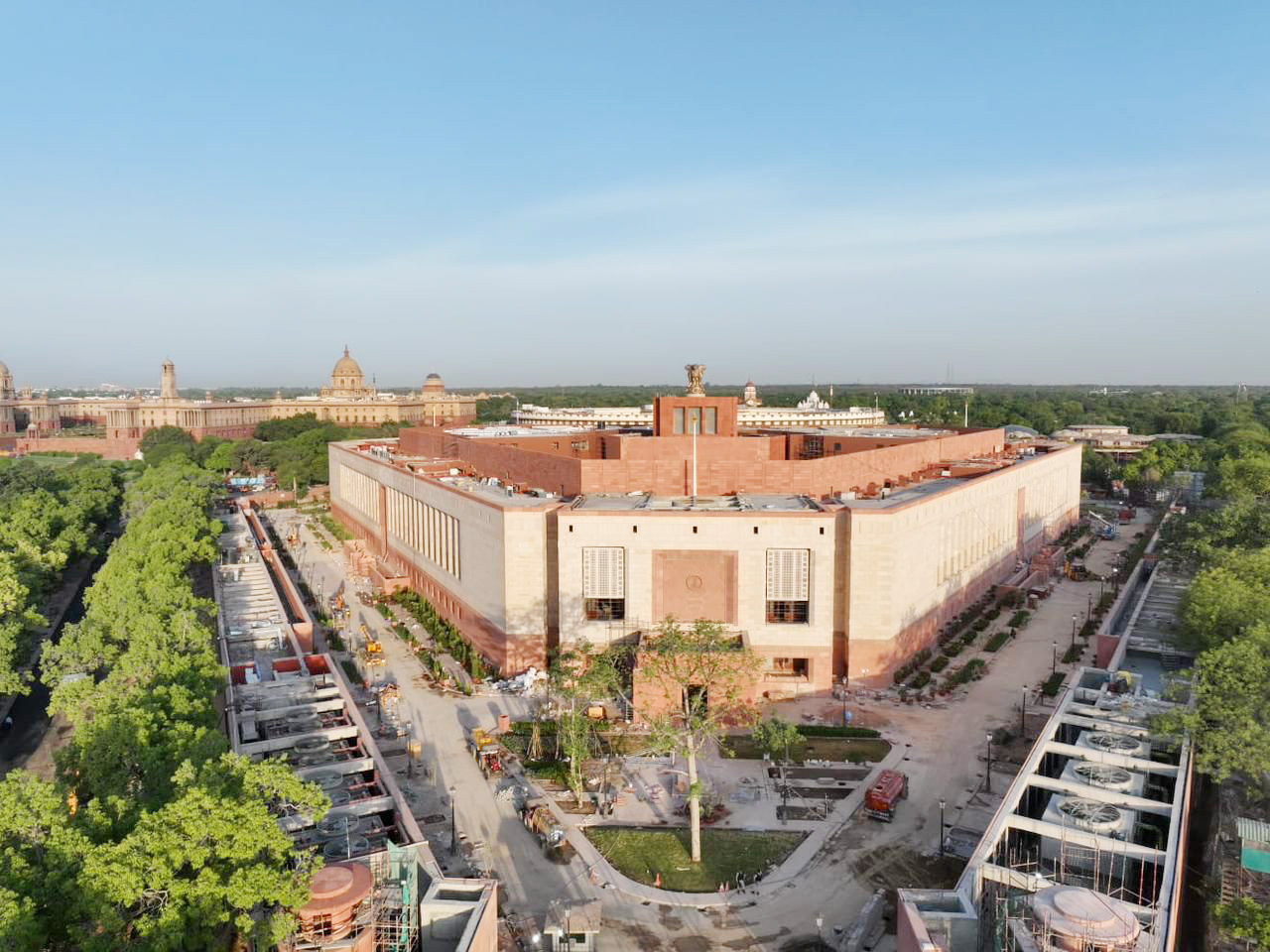
Parliament House, New Delhi, India. The Commonwealth Charter states the Commonwealth's commitment to democracy, and many Commonwealth countries use the Westminster system.

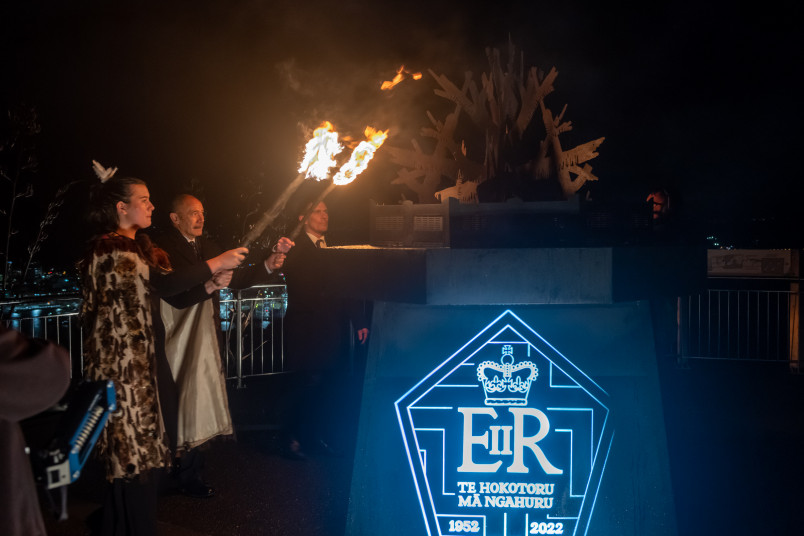
Lighting of a jubilee beacon for Queen Elizabeth II's Platinum Jubilee in 2022 in Wellington, New Zealand

Commonwealth countries have similar legal and government systems, whilst the Commonwealth Charter includes commitments to democracy, human rights and the rule of law. A majority of the Commonwealth countries have a Westminster system of parliamentary democracy, with elected legislatures, multi-party elections, responsible government and often two chambers. The Commonwealth Parliamentary Association facilitates co-operation between legislatures across the Commonwealth, and the Commonwealth Local Government Forum promotes good governance among local government officials.

Nonetheless, Commonwealth leadership was criticised for admitting Gabon as a member at the 2022 Commonwealth Heads of Government Meeting in Kigali, Rwanda – a country with poor human rights record – despite the fact that Gabon had been governed for 56 years by the kleptocratic Bongo family, until they were overthrown in a coup in 2023.

Most Commonwealth countries use common law, modelled on English law. The Latimer House Principles adopted in 2003 reflect the separation of powers. Judges are appointed by independent commissions in most Commonwealth countries, a change which took place across the Commonwealth in the late 20th and early 21st centuries and is reflected in the Cape Town Principles.

Pacific Island states often appoint judges from other Commonwealth countries. For instance, Commonwealth nationals are eligible to serve on the High Court of Fiji.

==== Judicial Committee of the Privy Council ====
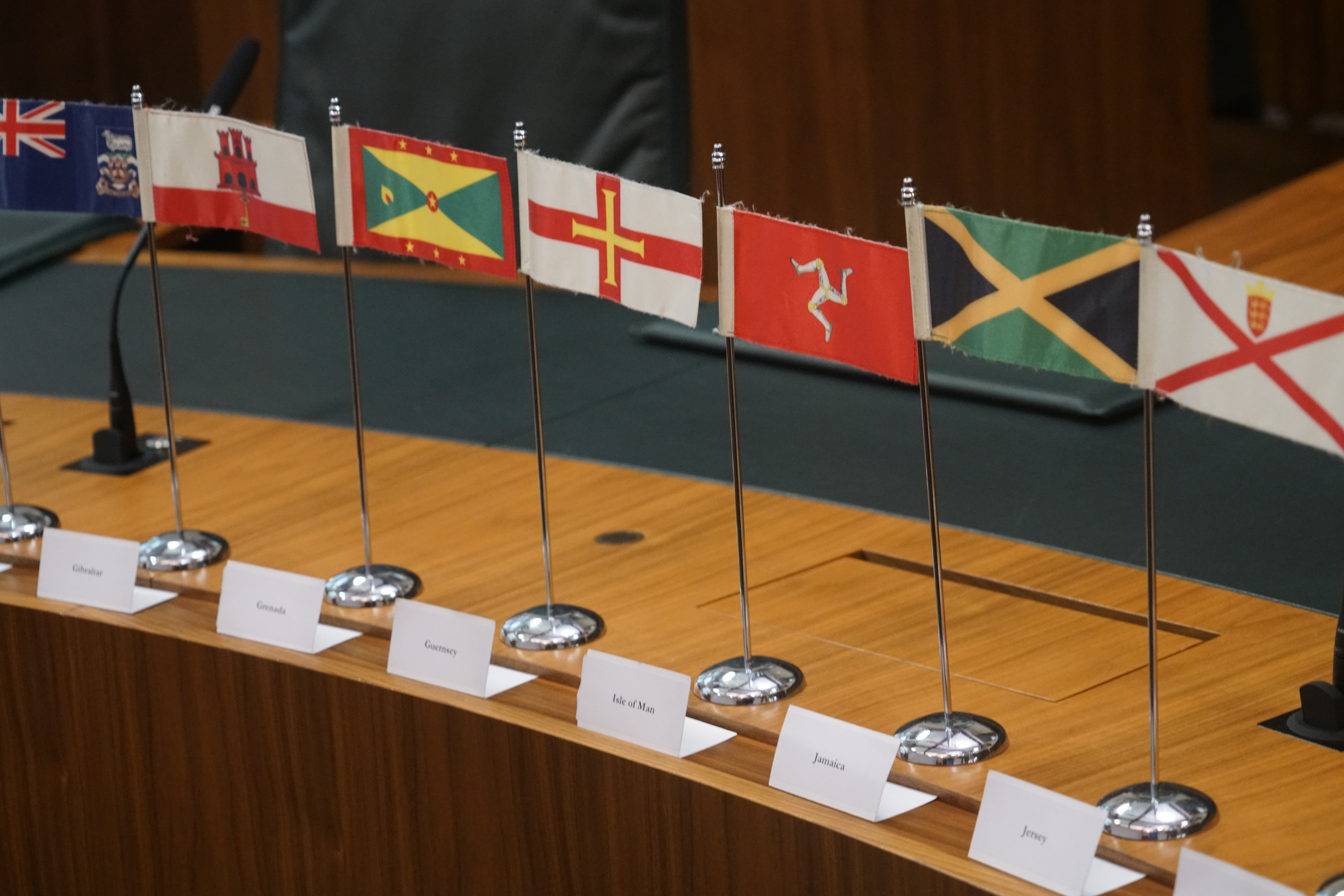
The Judicial Committee of the Privy Council is the highest court of appeal for several Commonwealth nations.

The Judicial Committee of the Privy Council is the supreme court of 14 Commonwealth countries, including the Cook Islands and Niue which are under the Realm of New Zealand (though New Zealand itself does not make appeals to the Privy Council).

=== Symbols ===
The Commonwealth has adopted a number of symbols that represent the association of its members. The English language is recognised as a symbol of the members' heritage; as well as being considered a symbol of the Commonwealth, recognition of it as "the means of Commonwealth communication" is a prerequisite for Commonwealth membership.

The flag of the Commonwealth consists of the symbol of the Commonwealth Secretariat, a gold globe surrounded by emanating rays, on a dark blue field; it was designed for the second CHOGM in 1973, and officially adopted on 26 March 1976. 1976 also saw the organisation agree to a common date on which to commemorate Commonwealth Day, the second Monday in March, having developed separately on different dates from Empire Day celebrations.

Also to mark the 60th anniversary (Diamond Jubilee) of the London Declaration in 2009, the Commonwealth Secretariat commissioned Paul Carroll to compose "The Commonwealth Anthem". The lyrics of the Anthem are taken from the 1948 Universal Declaration of Human Rights. The Commonwealth Youth Orchestra published renditions of the Anthem with and without an introductory narrative.

=== Recognition ===
In 2009, to mark the 60th anniversary of the founding of the Commonwealth, the Royal Commonwealth Society commissioned a poll of public opinion in seven of the member states: Australia, Canada, India, Jamaica, Malaysia, South Africa and the United Kingdom. It found that most people in these countries were largely ignorant of the Commonwealth's activities, aside from the Commonwealth Games, and indifferent toward its future. Support for the Commonwealth was twice as high in developing countries as in developed countries; it was lowest in the United Kingdom.

== See also ==
- Anglosphere
- English-speaking world
- Commonwealth Caribbean
- La Francophonie (OIF), an association of countries where the French language and French culture are prominent
- Community of Portuguese Language Countries, a grouping of Portuguese-speaking countries and territories
- Organization of Ibero-American States, consisting of Iberophone nations
- Latin Union, which consisted of nations using Romance languages
- Dutch Language Union
