= Special membership of the Commonwealth of Nations =

Country with limited membership status

A special member was a member of the Commonwealth of Nations whose participation was limited in certain functions. Originally, it was a status held by a few newly joined countries, whose involvement was limited by its own limited financial resources. More recently, the name has been changed to member in arrears, from the 2007 CHOGM on the recommendation of the Committee on Commonwealth Membership. The guidelines came from the 2003 CHOGM in Abuja that strengthened and replaced the 1999 CHOGM Durban guidelines.

They are not required to make payments to the Commonwealth. They may attend most functions and organs of the Commonwealth, but are not invited to attend Commonwealth Heads of Government Meetings. They are, although limited in these respects, still considered members of the Commonwealth.

The status was created especially for Nauru, which had an exceptionally small population and area. Nauru was followed by fellow Pacific sovereign state Tuvalu, and then the larger Saint Vincent and the Grenadines and Maldives. These progressively gained full membership, leaving none from September 2000. However, Nauru fell behind on its subscription payments, and reverted to a special member in July 2005. Nauru has been a full member again since June 2011.

== List of special members ==
| Member | Special membership | Full membership |
|---|---|---|
| Nauru (first time) | 1 November 1968 | 1 May 1999 |
| Tuvalu | 1 October 1978 | 1 September 2000 |
| Saint Vincent and the Grenadines | 27 October 1979 | 1 June 1985 |
| Maldives | 9 July 1982 | 20 July 1985 |
| Nauru (second time) | July 2005 | 26 June 2011 |
