= List of international presidential trips made by Ayub Khan =

This is a list of international presidential trips made by Ayub Khan, the 2nd President of Pakistan.

== 1960 ==
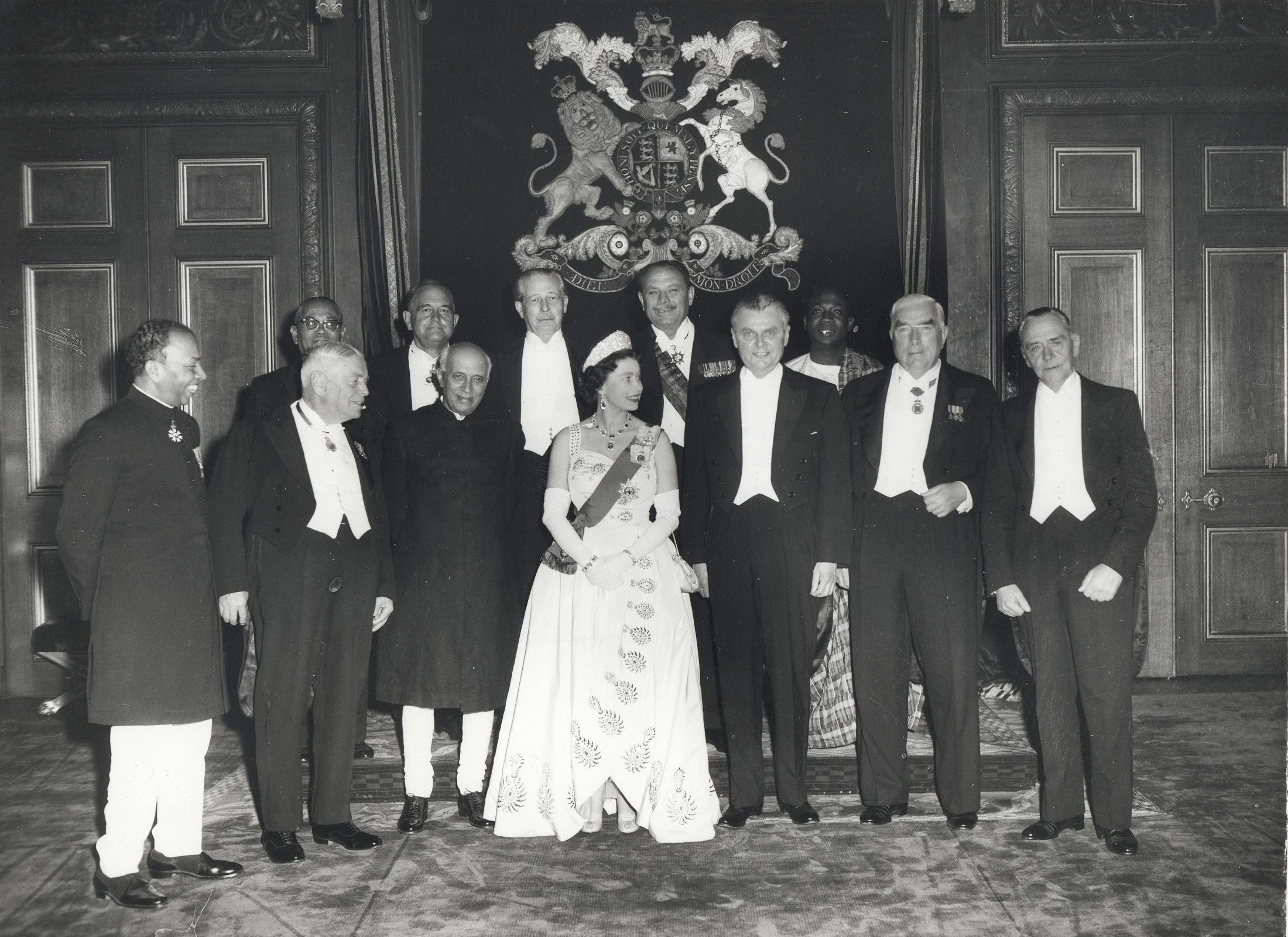
President of Pakistan Ayub Khan with Queen Elizabeth II and the Prime Ministers of the Commonwealth Nations, at Windsor Castle.

Country	Date/s	Engagements	Ref.
United Kingdom	3–13 May	Attended the 1960 Commonwealth Prime Ministers' Conference in London. Met Indian Prime Minister Jawaharlal Nehru on 4 May.	
United Arab Republic	5–11 November	State visit to Cairo. Met President Gamal Abdel Nasser.	
Burma	1–4 December	State visit to Burma. Met President Win Maung and Prime Minister U Nu.	
Indonesia	4–11 December	State visit to Indonesia. Met President Sukarno and held talks on bilateral relations.	

== 1961 ==
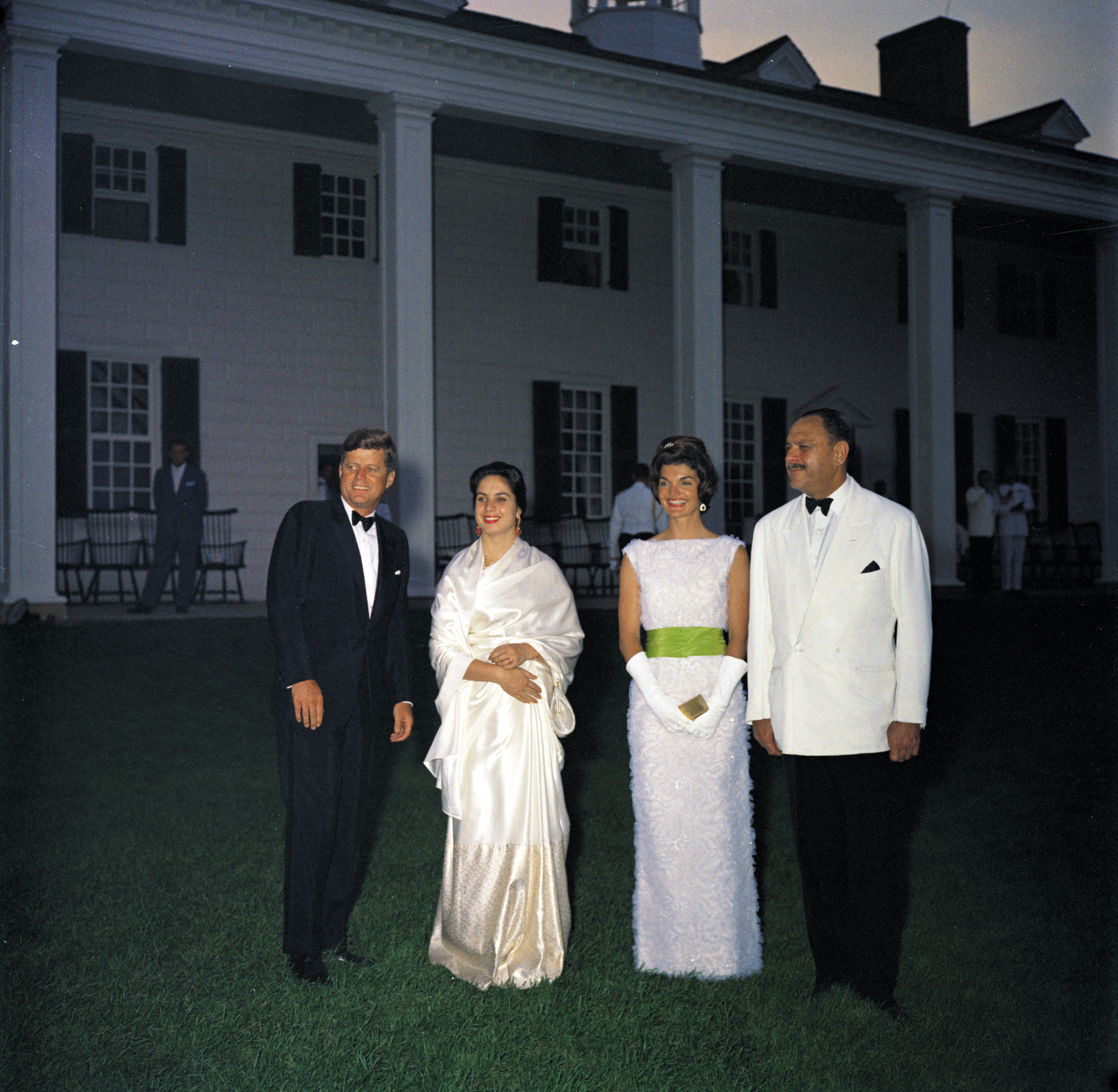
President of Pakistan Ayub Khan with President of the United States John F. Kennedy and First Lady Jacqueline Kennedy at Mount Vernon, 15 July 1961.

Country	Date/s	Engagements	Ref.
United States	11–18 July	State visit to the United States. Met President John F. Kennedy, addressed a joint session of the United States Congress, visited the Islamic Center of Washington, and travelled to New York City and Texas.	

== 1962 ==
Country	Date/s	Engagements	Ref.
France	September	Visited Paris on a state visit and met President Charles de Gaulle.	
United States	24–27 September	Informal visit to the United States. Met President John F. Kennedy at Newport, Rhode Island.	

== 1963 ==
Country	Date/s	Engagements	Ref.
Ceylon	8–15 December	State visit to Ceylon. Met Prime Minister Sirimavo Bandaranaike and addressed Parliament.	

== 1964 ==
Country	Date/s	Engagements	Ref.
Kingdom of Afghanistan	1 July	Short visit to Kabul. Met King Mohammed Zahir Shah.	
Pahlavi Iran	1 July	Stopover in Tehran. Met the Shah of Iran.	
United Kingdom	6–15 July	Attended the 1964 Commonwealth Prime Ministers' Conference in London. Met Jomo Kenyatta and other Commonwealth leaders.	
Turkey	21 July	Attended the Istanbul summit with President Cemal Gürsel and the Shah of Iran.	

== 1965 ==
Country	Date/s	Engagements	Ref.
China	2–9 March	Official visit to China. Met President Liu Shaoqi, Chairman Mao Zedong and Premier Zhou Enlai; a joint communique was issued.	
Soviet Union	3–10 April	State visit to the Soviet Union. Met Premier Alexei Kosygin and other Soviet leaders.	
United Arab Republic	14–16 June	State visit to Cairo. Met President Gamal Abdel Nasser.	
United Kingdom	16–25 June	Held talks with Prime Minister Harold Wilson and attended the 1965 Commonwealth Prime Ministers' Conference in London.	
United Kingdom	11 December	Stopover in London; met Prime Minister Harold Wilson before travelling to New York and Washington.	
United Nations	13 December	Visited United Nations Headquarters, met Secretary-General U Thant, and addressed the United Nations General Assembly.	
United States	14–15 December	Held talks with President Lyndon B. Johnson in Washington.	

== 1966 ==
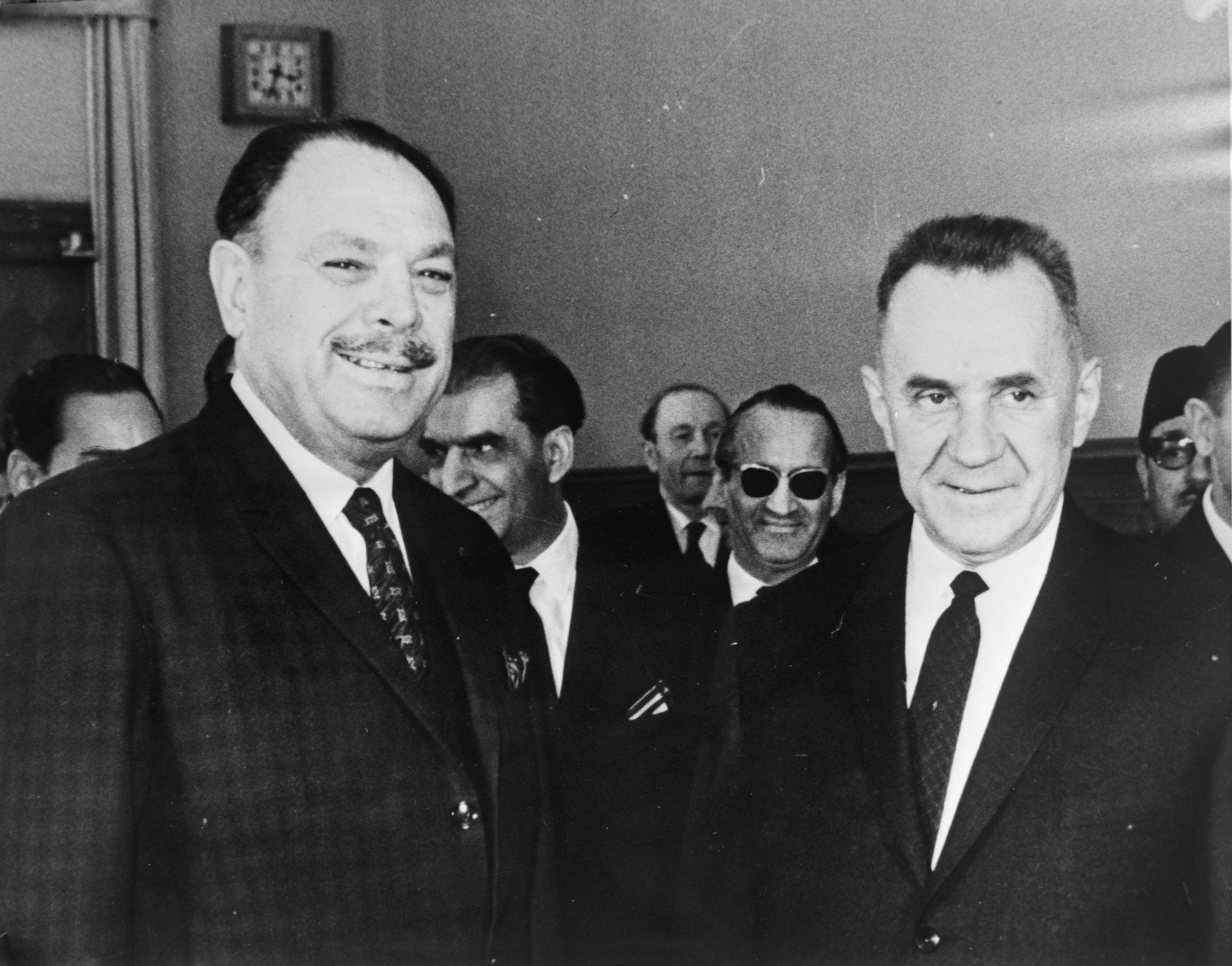
Ayub Khan with Alexei Kosygin at Tashkent during the Tashkent negotiations.

Country	Date/s	Engagements	Ref.
Soviet Union	3–10 January	Attended the Soviet-sponsored talks at Tashkent; signed the Tashkent Declaration with Prime Minister Lal Bahadur Shastri.	
United Kingdom	17–28 November	State visit to the United Kingdom. Received by Queen Elizabeth II; also visited British scientific and industrial institutions.	

== 1967 ==
Country	Date/s	Engagements	Ref.
Soviet Union	25 September – 4 October	Official visit to the Soviet Union. Met Premier Alexei Kosygin and Chairman of the Presidium Nikolai Podgorny; a joint communique was issued.	
France	17–20 October	Official visit to France. Met President Charles de Gaulle in Paris.	

== 1968 ==
Country	Date/s	Engagements	Ref.
United Kingdom	22–31 July	Visited the United Kingdom and held talks with Prime Minister Harold Wilson.	
