= List of international prime ministerial trips made by Walter Nash =

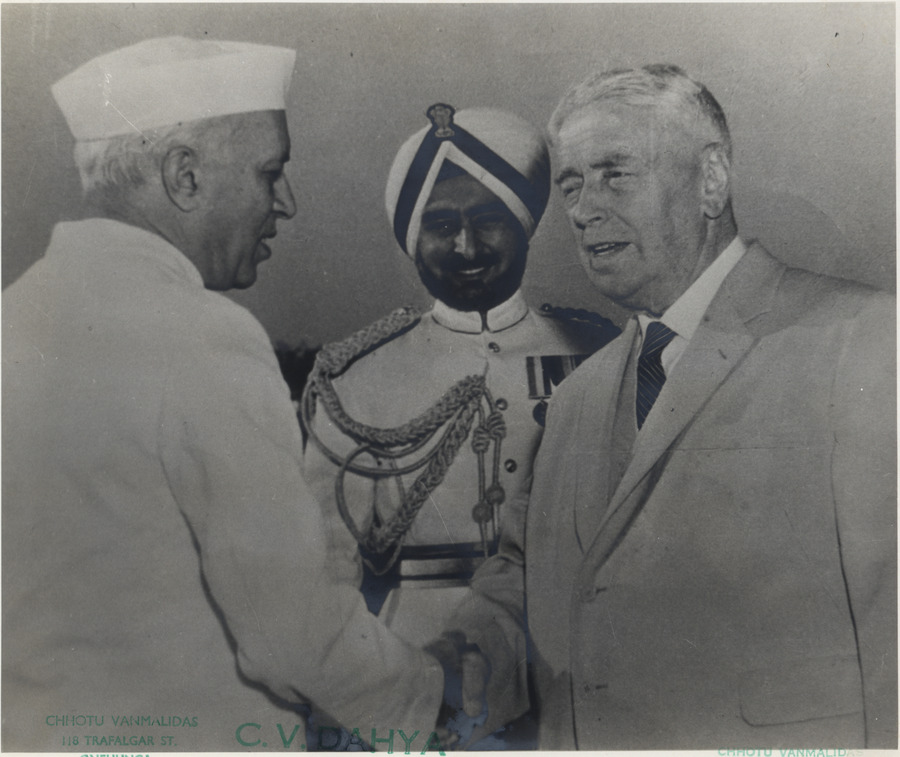
Nash meeting Indian Prime Minister Jawaharlal Nehru in 1958

Walter Nash, who served as the 27th prime minister of New Zealand from 12 December 1957 until 12 December 1960, travelled internationally to attend bilateral and multilateral diplomatic meetings and to lead trade delegations. During his premiership, Nash made 33 international trips to 21 sovereign countries.

== Background ==
Nash appointed himself as Minister of Foreign Affairs without an associate leading him to focus on external matters for much of his premiership. As a result, Nash was noted for his frequent absences from the country, leaving his ministers to defend the record of the government in parliament from the opposition.

== Summary ==
Unless otherwise noted the information is sourced from here:

=== 1958 ===
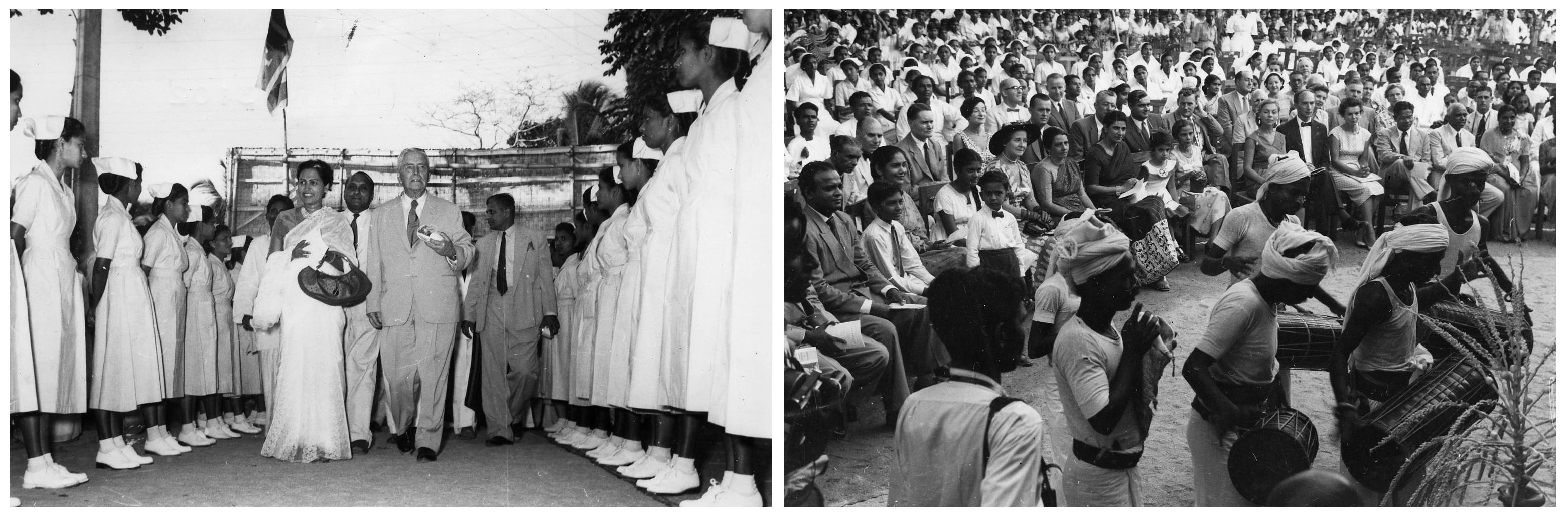
Photos of Nash's visit to Colombo in 1958

Country	Locations	Dates	Details
Australia	Sydney	27 February – 2 March	Nash held bilateral trade talks with Australian prime minister Robert Menzies
Indonesia	Jakarta	3 March	Nash had a meeting with officials around security of Colombo Plan staff in local crisis areas
Singapore	Singapore	3–5 March	Nash met with the Governor of Singapore, Sir William Goode, and the Chief Minister, Lim Yew Hock
Malaya	Kuala Lumpur	5–8 March	Nash attended the United Nations Economic Commission for Asia and the Far East conference
Philippines	Manilla	8–17 March	Nash attended the meeting of the SEATO Council in Manila
India	New Delhi; Bombay	17–21 March	Nash held a bilateral meeting with Indian prime minister Jawaharlal Nehru
Ceylon	Colombo	21–24 March	Nash held a bilateral meeting with Ceylonese prime minister S. W. R. D. Bandaranaike
Pakistan	Karachi; Hyderabad	24–27 March	Nash held a bilateral meeting with Pakistani prime minister Feroz Khan Noon
Thailand	Bangkok	27–30 April	Nash visited SEATO headquarters
Australia	Sydney	1–2 April	Nash held a bilateral meeting about the Antarctic Plan with Australian prime minister Robert Menzies
Australia	Sydney	13–15 June	Nash held a bilateral meeting about trade and finances with Australian prime minister Robert Menzies
United States	New York City; Washington D.C.	28 September – 9 October	Nash led New Zealand's delegation to the United Nations and met with United States Secretary of State John Foster Dulles
Canada	Ottawa	9–15 October	Nash held bilateral talks with Canadian prime minister John Diefenbaker
United States	San Francisco; Seattle	9–17 November	Nash led New Zealand's delegation to the Colombo Plan conference
Canada	Vancouver	17–19 November	On a short official state visit Nash visited the University of British Columbia

=== 1959 ===
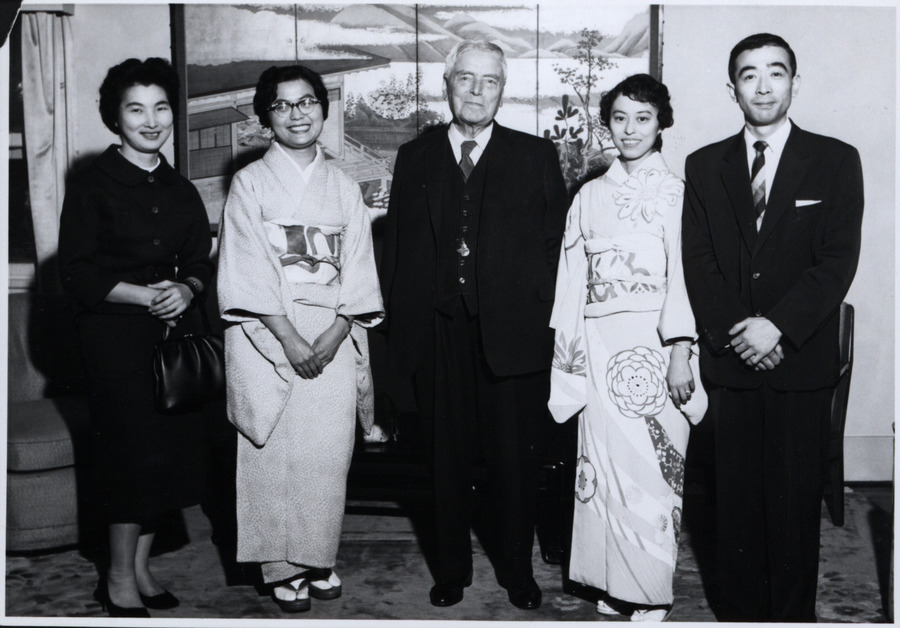
Nash in Japan in 1959

Country	Locations	Dates	Details
Japan	Tokyo; Osaka	19 February – 1 March	Nash held trade negotiations with Japanese prime minister Nobusuke Kishi and had an audience with Emperor Hirohito
United States	San Francisco; New York City; Washington D.C.	25 October – 3 November	Nash attended ANZUS pact talks and met with president Dwight D. Eisenhower
United Kingdom	London	3–9 November	Nash held a bilateral meeting with British prime minister Harold Macmillan
Indonesia	Yogyakarta	9–20 November	Nash attended the Colombo Plan conference

=== 1960 ===
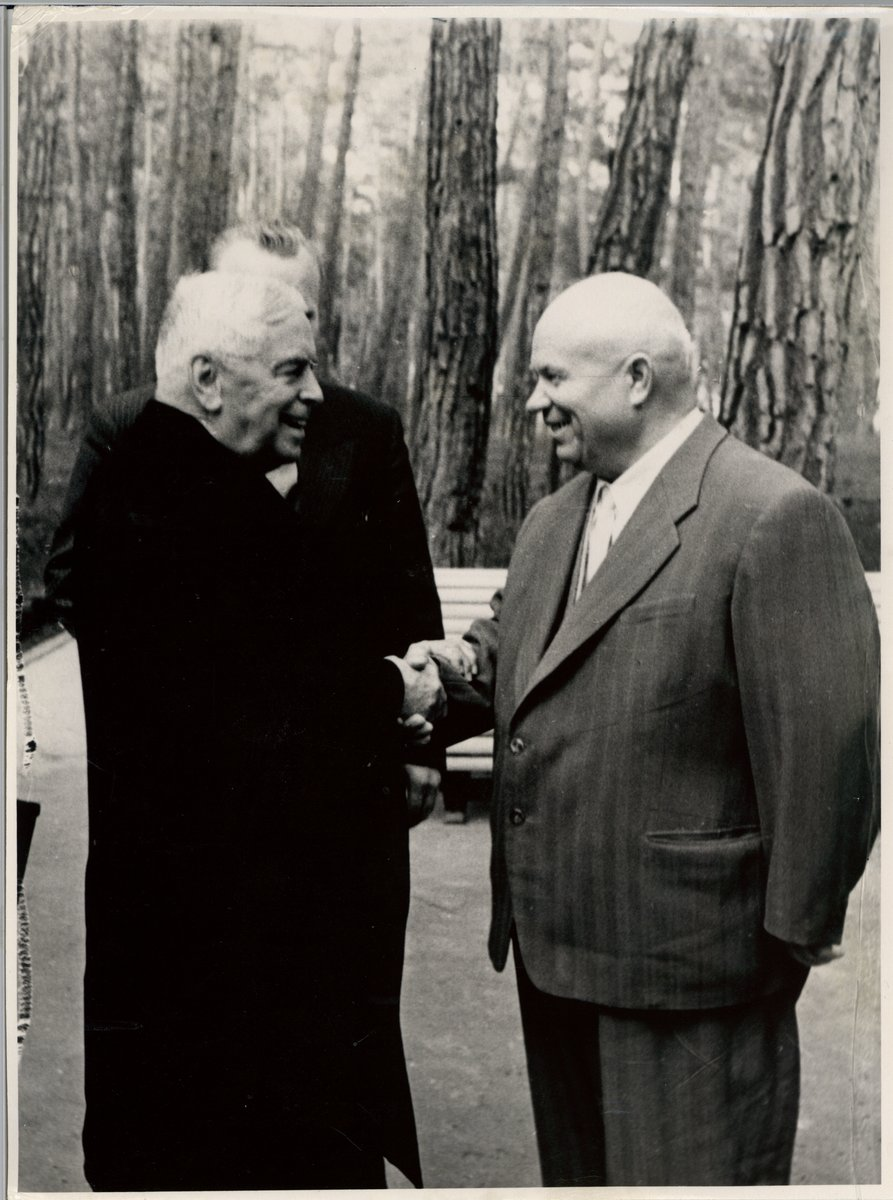
Nash meeting Soviet leader Nikita Khrushchev in 1960

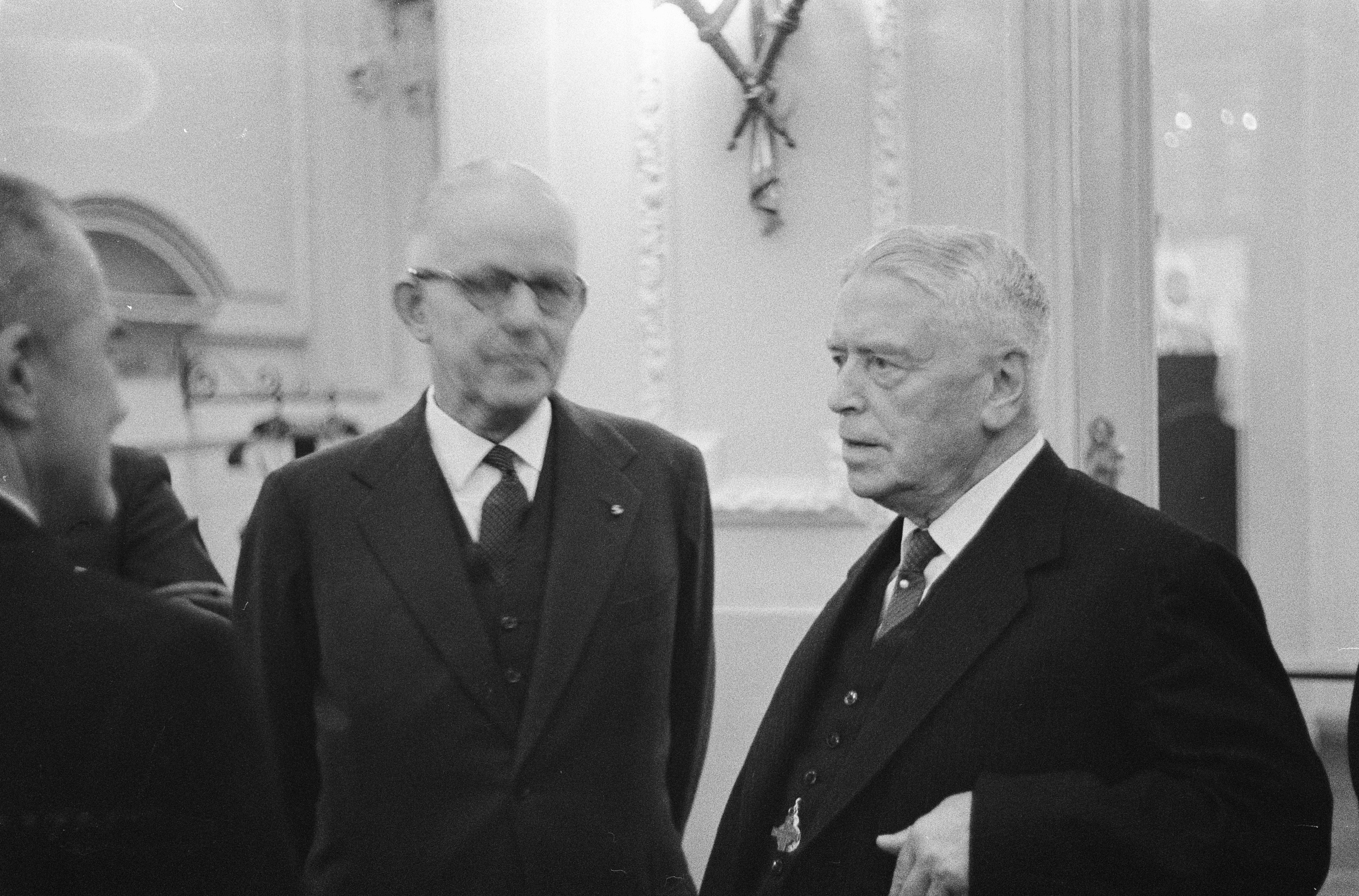
Nash in The Hague in 1960

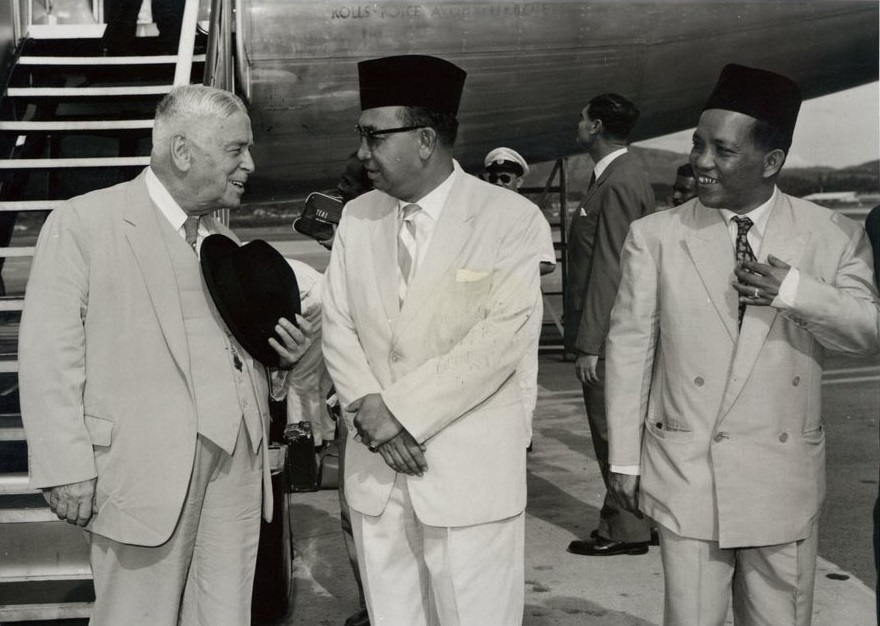
Nash and Abdul Razak Hussein in Kuala Lumpur in 1960

Country	Locations	Dates	Details
Singapore	Singapore	5–8 April	Nash held a bilateral meeting with Singaporean prime minister Lee Kuan Yew; he was Singapore's first state visitor since its independence
Pakistan	Karachi	8–10 April	Nash held a bilateral meeting with Pakistani prime minister Ayub Khan
United Kingdom	London	11–14 April	Nash held a bilateral meeting with British prime minister Harold Macmillan and Foreign Secretary Alec Douglas-Home
France	Paris	14–16 April	Nash had talks with French president Charles de Gaulle and Prime Minister Michel Debré
United Kingdom	London	16–18 April	Nash had a layover in London between his visits to France and the Soviet Union
USSR	Moscow; Gagra; Kiev; Leningrad	18–24 April	Nash held disarmament talks with Soviet leader Nikita Khrushchev
Italy	Rome	26–28 April	Nash held a bilateral meeting with Italian president Giovanni Gronchi
Vatican City	Vatican City	29 April	Nash had an audience with Pope John XXIII
United Kingdom	London	30 April – 11 May	Nash attended the 1960 Commonwealth Prime Ministers' Conference and the wedding of Princess Margaret and Antony Armstrong-Jones
Netherlands	Amsterdam; The Hague	19–20 May	Nash met with the Dutch cabinet to discuss trade and events in Dutch New Guinea
West Germany	Bonn; Düsseldorf	24–26 May	Nash met with German leaders Konrad Adenauer and Willy Brandt
Denmark	Copenhagen	28–29 May	Nash had trade talks with the Danish government
United States	New York City; Washington D.C.	31 May – 4 June	Nash attended the SEATO conference
Malaya	Kuala Lumpur	5–6 June	Nash opened the agricultural college at the University of Malaya which had been donated by New Zealand

== See also ==
- Foreign relations of New Zealand
