= 1949 Commonwealth Prime Ministers' Conference =

4th Commonwealth Prime Ministers' Conference
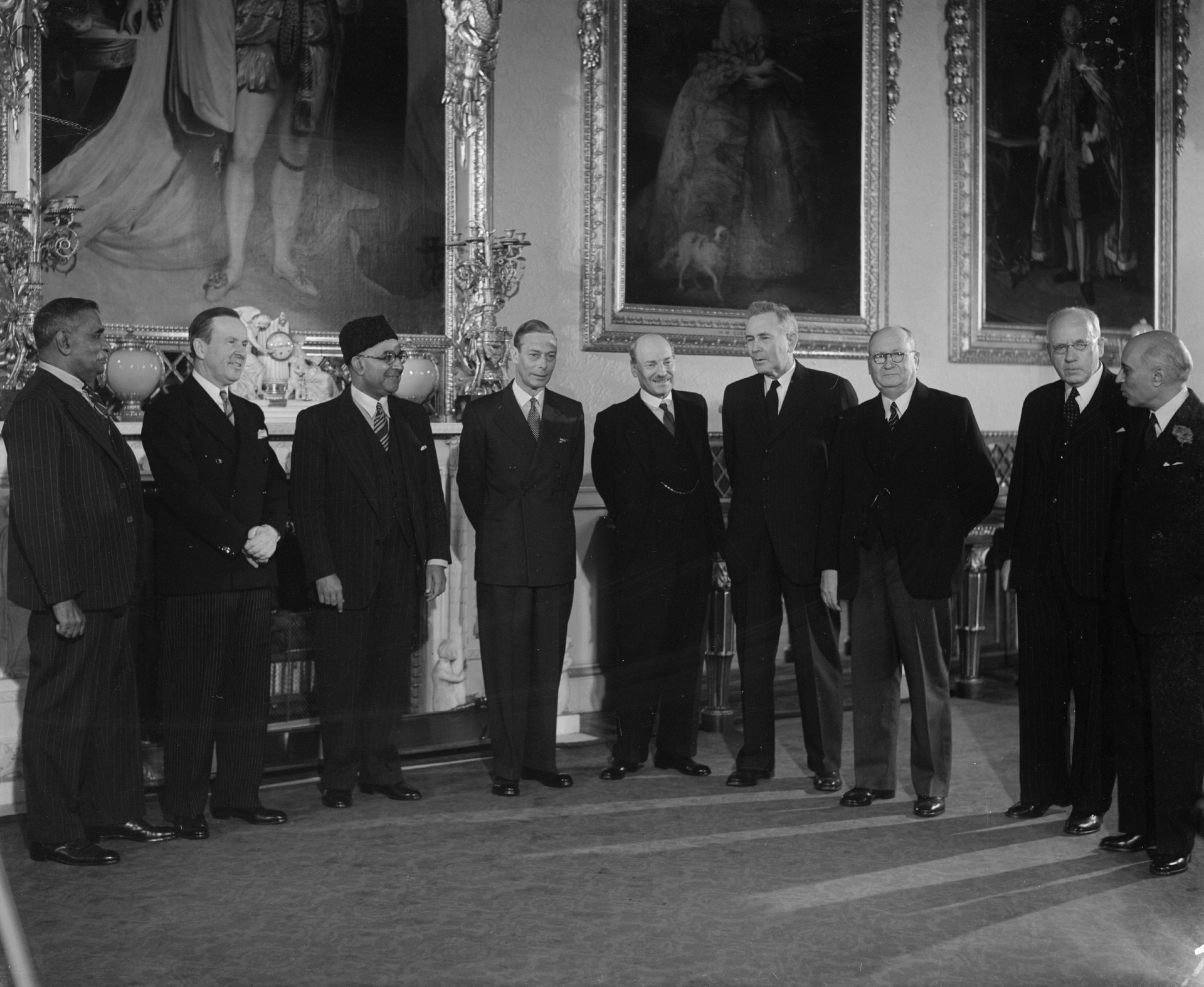
- The Commonwealth prime ministers with King George VI at Buckingham Palace for the Conference, 1949
- Host country: United Kingdom
- Dates: 22–29 April 1949
- Cities: London
- Participants: 8
- Chair: Clement Attlee (British prime minister)
- Follows: 1948
- Precedes: 1951

Key points
- Dominion of India, London Declaration, Commonwealth citizenship, role of the Monarchy (King/Queen) (Head of the Commonwealth)

The 1949 Commonwealth Prime Ministers' Conference was the fourth meeting of the Heads of government of the Commonwealth of Nations. It was held in the United Kingdom in April 1949 and was hosted by British Prime Minister Clement Attlee.

The principal topic of the conference was the relationship of India, which was intending to become a republic, to the Commonwealth. Hitherto the Commonwealth had been an association of Britain and British dominions, united by sharing the British sovereign as their head of state. The conference discussed whether a Commonwealth state could become a republic and remain in the Commonwealth and, if so, whether it had the same status in the Commonwealth as the dominions who had the British sovereign as their head of state.

The Canadian government feared that, if India was not permitted to remain in the Commonwealth as an autonomous republic, then Pakistan, Ceylon, and South Africa would soon leave as well, resulting in the Commonwealth's collapse. Australian prime minister Ben Chifley argued for maintaining a strong British connection, whilst South Africa's newly elected nationalist prime minister, D. F. Malan, argued for complete independence.

In the London Declaration, Commonwealth prime ministers agreed to India's continued membership in the Commonwealth as a republic and that the King would have a new role in the Commonwealth not as a joint head of state but as "the symbol of the free association of its member nations, and as such Head of the Commonwealth."

Four days before the Conference met, Ireland formally declared itself a republic. The other members of the Commonwealth chose to regard that declaration as terminating Ireland's membership of the Commonwealth. Ireland had not participated in Commonwealth affairs since the 1930s but this was the first conference to be held after Ireland's membership was regarded as terminated.

== Participants ==
Nation	Name	Portfolio
United Kingdom	Clement Attlee	Prime Minister (Chairman)
Australia	Ben Chifley	Prime Minister
Canada	Lester Pearson	Secretary of State for External Affairs
Ceylon	Don Stephen Senanayake	Prime Minister
India	Jawaharlal Nehru	Prime Minister
New Zealand	Peter Fraser	Prime Minister
Pakistan	Liaquat Ali Khan	Prime Minister
South Africa	Daniël François (D. F.) Malan	Prime Minister
