= 1969 Commonwealth Prime Ministers' Conference =

17th Commonwealth Prime Ministers' Conference
- Host country: United Kingdom
- Dates: 7–15 January 1969
- Cities: London
- Venues: Marlborough House
- Participants: 28
- Heads of Government: 24
- Chair: Harold Wilson (Prime Minister)
- Follows: September 1966
- Precedes: 1971 Commonwealth Heads of Government Meeting

Key points
- Review of the world diplomatic and economic situation, Rhodesia, Biafra crisis, Commonwealth co-operation.

The 1969 Commonwealth Prime Ministers' Conference was the 17th Meeting of the Heads of Government of the Commonwealth of Nations. It was held in the United Kingdom in January 1969, and was hosted by British Prime Minister Harold Wilson.

Five newly independent member countries participated for the first time: Botswana, Barbados, Lesotho, Mauritius and Swaziland.

On the issue of the rogue colony of Rhodesia, Britain re-committed itself to the policy of no independence before majority rule (NIBMAR), which it had adopted at the last Prime Ministers' conference in September 1966.

Also discussed was the Biafra crisis in Nigeria and discrimination against South Asian communities living in Africa and Black and Asian immigrants living in the UK.

== Participants ==
The following nations were represented:

Nation	Name	Position
United Kingdom	Harold Wilson (Chairman)	Prime Minister
Australia	John Gorton	Prime Minister
Barbados	Errol Barrow	Prime Minister
Botswana	Sir Seretse Khama	President
Canada	Pierre Trudeau	Prime Minister
Ceylon	Dudley Senanayake	Prime Minister
Cyprus	Makarios III	President
The Gambia	Sir Dawda Jawara	Prime Minister
Ghana	John Willie Kofi Harlley	Deputy Chairman, National Liberation Council
Guyana	Forbes Burnham	Prime Minister
India	Indira Gandhi	Prime Minister
Jamaica	Hugh Shearer	Prime Minister
Kenya	James Gichuru	Minister of Finance
Lesotho	Leabua Jonathan	Prime Minister
Malawi	Hastings Banda	President
Malaysia	Tunku Abdul Rahman	Prime Minister
Malta	Giorgio Borġ Olivier	Prime Minister
Mauritius	Sir Seewoosagur Ramgoolam	Prime Minister
New Zealand	Keith Holyoake	Prime Minister
Nigeria	Obafemi Awolowo	Federal Commissioner for Finance
Pakistan	Mian Arshad Hussain	Minister for Foreign Affairs
Sierra Leone	Siaka Stevens	Prime Minister
Singapore	Lee Kuan Yew	Prime Minister
Swaziland	Makhosini Dlamini	Prime Minister
Tanzania	Julius Nyerere	President
Trinidad and Tobago	Eric Williams	Prime Minister
Uganda	Milton Obote	Prime Minister
Zambia	Kenneth Kaunda	President
