= 1948 Commonwealth Prime Ministers' Conference =

3rd Commonwealth Prime Ministers' Conference
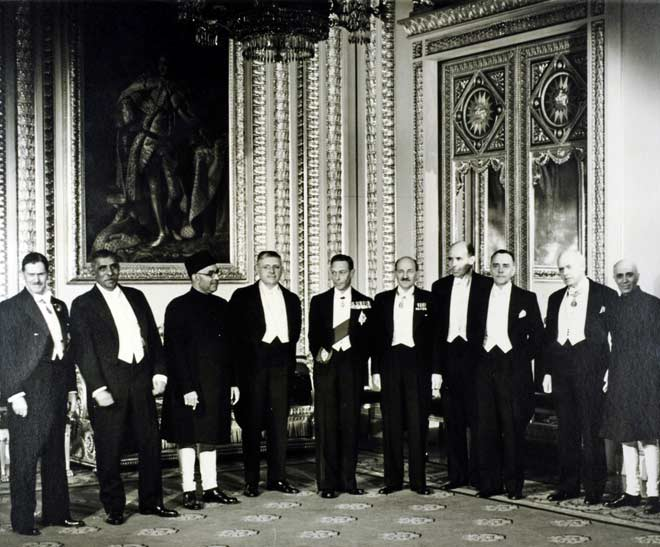
- Host country: United Kingdom
- Dates: 11–22 October 1948
- Cities: London
- Participants: 9
- Chair: Clement Attlee (Prime Minister of the United Kingdom)
- Follows: 1946
- Precedes: 1949

Key points
- Independence of India, Pakistan & Ceylon; economic, military and diplomatic co-operation

The 1948 Commonwealth Prime Ministers' Conference was the third Meeting of the Heads of Government of the British Commonwealth. It was held in the United Kingdom in October 1948, and hosted by British Prime Minister, Clement Attlee.

It was the first such meeting to be attended by the prime ministers of recently independent Asian states Ceylon, India and Pakistan. The growth in membership ended the previous 'intimacy' of the meeting. The issue of whether countries, specifically India, could remain Commonwealth members if they became republics was raised but was not resolved until the next conference in 1949.

Ireland was initially invited to attend the meeting. After Ireland announced the pending repeal of its last connection to the British king, this invitation was revoked. At the time, the British Commonwealth still regarded Ireland as one of its members. Ireland had not participated in any equivalent conferences since 1932. It had announced plans to adopt legislation severing all ties with the British crown, but had not yet brought it into force. Irish Minister for External Affairs Seán MacBride and Minister for Finance Patrick McGilligan attended one day of the conference as observers.

The Final Communique issued by the leaders at the conclusion of the meeting saw a change in nomenclature. The terms 'Dominion' and 'Dominion Government' were superseded by 'Commonwealth country' and 'Commonwealth Government'. 'British' was omitted in front of 'Commonwealth of Nations' for the first time in the Communique.

== Participants ==
Nation	Name	Portfolio
United Kingdom	Clement Attlee	Prime Minister (chairman)
Australia	Herbert Evatt	Deputy Prime Minister
Canada	William Lyon Mackenzie King	Prime Minister
(Dominion of Ceylon) Ceylon	Don Stephen Senanayake	Prime Minister
India	Jawaharlal Nehru	Prime Minister
New Zealand	Peter Fraser	Prime Minister
Pakistan	Liaquat Ali Khan	Prime Minister
South Africa	Eric Louw	Minister of Mines and Economic Affairs
Southern Rhodesia	Sir Godfrey Huggins	Prime Minister
