= 1957 Commonwealth Prime Ministers' Conference =

9th Commonwealth Prime Ministers' Conference
- Host country: United Kingdom
- Dates: 26 June–5 July 1957
- Cities: London
- Participants: 10
- Chair: Harold Macmillan (Prime Minister)
- Follows: 1956
- Precedes: 1960

Key points
- Commonwealth trade relations, European Economic Community, Suez Crisis, Hungarian Revolution of 1956, disarmament

The 1957 Commonwealth Prime Ministers' Conference was the ninth Meeting of the Heads of Government of the Commonwealth of Nations. It was held in the United Kingdom in June 1957, and was hosted by British Prime Minister, Harold Macmillan.

The new Canadian prime minister, John Diefenbaker, proposed the intensification of trade relations within the Commonwealth. His calls for an Empire Trade Conference were resisted by the British government, which had an eye towards the UK developing stronger trade relations with Europe and the newly formed European Economic Community; the impact of the UK joining a European free trade area and its possible consequences on Commonwealth trade were a matter of concern, with a Commonwealth Trade and Economic Conference being called for the next year.

The aftermath of the Suez Crisis and invasion of Hungary of the previous year were also discussed, with the Commonwealth leaders calling for the strengthening of the United Nations as an instrument of peace. The Suez Crisis had badly split the Commonwealth resulting in India, Pakistan and Ceylon considering leaving the organisation; Canadian External Affairs Minister Lester Pearson told the Canadian House of Commons that the Commonwealth faced dissolution over Suez. Multilateral nuclear disarmament negotiations were also discussed.

This was the first Commonwealth Prime Ministers' Conference attended by Ghana, which had attained independence in March 1957.

== Participants ==
Nation	Name	Portfolio
United Kingdom	Harold Macmillan	Prime Minister (Chairman)
Australia	Robert Menzies	Prime Minister
Canada	John Diefenbaker	Prime Minister
Ceylon	M. W. H. de Silva	Minister of Justice and Leader of the Senate
Ghana	Kwame Nkrumah	Prime Minister
India	Jawaharlal Nehru	Prime Minister
New Zealand	Tom Macdonald	Minister of External Affairs and Defence
Pakistan	Huseyn Shaheed Suhrawardy	Prime Minister
Rhodesia and Nyasaland	Sir Roy Welensky	Prime Minister
South Africa	Eric Louw	Minister of External Affairs
