= 1961 Commonwealth Prime Ministers' Conference =

11th meeting of the Commonwealth of Nations' heads of government

11th Commonwealth Prime Ministers' Conference
- Host country: United Kingdom
- Dates: 8–17 March 1961
- Cities: London
- Venues: Lancaster House
- Participants: 13
- Chair: Harold Macmillan (Prime Minister)
- Follows: 1960
- Precedes: 1962

Key points
- South Africa and apartheid, membership of South Africa, Cyprus and Sierra Leone, British membership in the Common Market, disarmament

The 1961 Commonwealth Prime Ministers' Conference was the 11th Meeting of the Heads of Government of the Commonwealth of Nations. It was held in the United Kingdom in March 1961, and was hosted by British Prime Minister, Harold Macmillan.

While Commonwealth conferences were normally held biennially, this conference was held after an interval of only a year following the May 1960 conference. This occurred due to disagreement over South Africa's continued membership of the Commonwealth, owing to its policy of racial segregation. Malaya's Prime Minister demanded South Africa's expulsion.

South African Prime Minister H.F. Verwoerd attended the conference to formally announce that South Africa would become a republic in May 1961, following approval in the October 1960 referendum. South Africa's application was opposed by the leaders of black majority-ruled African states, Indian Prime Minister Jawaharlal Nehru, Malaya's Tunku Abdul Rahman, other non-white Commonwealth countries and Canadian prime minister John Diefenbaker, due to South Africa's policy of apartheid. Canada was the only member of the Old Commonwealth to oppose South Africa's application. The "Keep South Africa In" group included Britain's Harold Macmillan, Rhodesia and Nyasaland's Roy Welensky, Australia's Robert Menzies and Keith Holyoake of New Zealand. Canadian prime minister John Diefenbaker proposed that South Africa only be re-admitted if it joined other states in condemning apartheid in principle. Once it became clear that South Africa's membership would be rejected, Verwoerd withdrew his country's application and left the conference.

Concerns were also expressed about Britain's prospective membership in the Common Market and the possible impact on trade relations between the United Kingdom and the Commonwealth. The Commonwealth also expressed its support for worldwide disarmament "subject to effective inspection and control".

Cyprus' application to join the Commonwealth, following its independence the previous year, was approved despite opposition from the United Kingdom, which objected to Cyprus not applying for membership prior to independence, as had been customary. Cyprus' President, Archbishop Makarios III, joined the conference once Cypriot membership was approved. The membership application of Sierra Leone was also accepted and became effective upon its independence on 27 April.

This was the first Commonwealth conference in which one of the heads of government was a woman, Sirimavo Ratwatte Dias Bandaranaike, who was also the first female prime minister in the world.

== Participants ==
Nation	Name	Portfolio
United Kingdom	Harold Macmillan	Prime Minister (chairman)
Australia	Robert Menzies	Prime Minister
Canada	John Diefenbaker	Prime Minister
Ceylon	Sirimavo Ratwatte Dias Bandaranaike	Prime Minister
Cyprus	Makarios III	President
Ghana	Kwame Nkrumah	President
India	Jawaharlal Nehru	Prime Minister
Malaya	Tunku Abdul Rahman	Prime Minister
New Zealand	Keith Holyoake	Prime Minister
Nigeria	Sir Abubakar Tafawa Balewa	Prime Minister
Pakistan	Ayub Khan	President
Rhodesia and Nyasaland	Sir Roy Welensky	Prime Minister
South Africa	H. F. Verwoerd	Prime Minister
