= 1951 Commonwealth Prime Ministers' Conference =

5th Commonwealth Prime Ministers' Conference
- Host country: United Kingdom
- Dates: 2–12 January 1951
- Cities: London
- Participants: 9
- Chair: Clement Attlee (Prime Minister)
- Follows: 1949
- Precedes: 1952

Key points
- Korean War, Japanese peace treaty

The 1951 Commonwealth Prime Ministers' Conference was the fifth Meeting of the Heads of Government of the British Commonwealth. It was held in the United Kingdom in January 1951, and hosted by British Prime Minister, Clement Attlee.

The principal topic of the conference was the Korean War with the summit issuing a declaration, proposed by Australian prime minister Robert Menzies, stating that the Commonwealth prime ministers "would welcome any feasible arrangement for a frank exchange of views with Stalin and Mao Tse-tung." The Commonwealth leaders also called for peace treaty negotiations with Japan to be concluded as soon as possible (see Treaty of San Francisco).

== Participants ==
Nation	Name	Portfolio
United Kingdom	Clement Attlee	Prime Minister (Chairman)
Australia	Robert Menzies	Prime Minister
Canada	Louis St. Laurent	Prime Minister
Ceylon	Don Stephen Senanayake	Prime Minister
India	Jawaharlal Nehru	Prime Minister
New Zealand	Sidney Holland	Prime Minister
Pakistan	Liaquat Ali Khan	Prime Minister
Southern Rhodesia	Sir Godfrey Huggins	Prime Minister
South Africa	Theophilus Ebenhaezer Dönges	Minister of the Interior
