= 1956 Commonwealth Prime Ministers' Conference =

8th Commonwealth Prime Ministers' Conference
- Group photo taken before the opening of the 1956 Commonwealth Prime Ministers' Conference
- Host country: United Kingdom
- Dates: 27 June–6 July 1956
- Cities: London
- Participants: 9
- Chair: Sir Anthony Eden (Prime Minister)
- Follows: 1955
- Precedes: 1957

Key points
- British bases in Ceylon, Cyprus, Cold War

The 1956 Commonwealth Prime Ministers' Conference was the eighth Meeting of the Heads of Government of the Commonwealth of Nations. It was held in the United Kingdom in June 1956, and was hosted by British Prime Minister, Sir Anthony Eden.

The new prime minister of Ceylon Solomon West Ridgeway Dias Bandaranaike pressured Eden to remove British military bases in Ceylon; Britain agreed to close the installations.

In international affairs, the leaders expressed their support for the People's Republic of China and Japan being admitted to the United Nations (see China and the United Nations) and welcomed liberalisation in the Soviet Union under Nikita Khrushchev hailing the "significant changes" in Soviet domestic and foreign policy as being positive steps for world peace. British attempts to negotiate a diplomatic settlement over competing Greek and Turkish claims to the soon to be independent British colony of Cyprus were also discussed.

== Participants ==
| Nation | Name | Portfolio |
|---|---|---|
| United Kingdom | Sir Anthony Eden | Prime Minister (Chairman) |
| Australia | Robert Menzies | Prime Minister |
| Canada | Louis St. Laurent | Prime Minister |
| Ceylon | Solomon West Ridgeway Dias Bandaranaike | Prime Minister |
| India | Jawaharlal Nehru | Prime Minister |
| New Zealand | Sidney Holland | Prime Minister |
| Pakistan | Chaudhri Muhammad Ali | Prime Minister |
| Rhodesia and Nyasaland | Godfrey Huggins, 1st Viscount Malvern | Prime Minister |
| South Africa | Johannes Gerhardus Strijdom | Prime Minister |
