= September 1966 Commonwealth Prime Ministers' Conference =

16th Commonwealth Prime Ministers' Conference
- Host country: United Kingdom
- Dates: 6–15 September 1966
- Cities: London
- Participants: 22
- Chair: Harold Wilson (Prime Minister)
- Follows: January 1966
- Precedes: 1969

Key points
- Rhodesia, disarmament

The September 1966 Commonwealth Prime Ministers' Conference was the 16th Meeting of the Heads of Government of the Commonwealth of Nations. It was held in the United Kingdom and was hosted by British Prime Minister Harold Wilson.

The conference was dominated by the rebellion of the British colony of Rhodesia, under the white minority rule of Ian Smith. Facing the possible collapse of the Commonwealth, with African states threatening to leave the association if no action was taken against Rhodesia, Britain agreed to a policy of no independence before majority rule (NIBMAR). In case Rhodesia did not comply, Britain declared it would participate in 'a resolution providing for effective and selective mandatory economic sanctions against Rhodesia' at the United Nations.

The Commonwealth also issued a statement calling for nuclear disarmament and denouncing nuclear weapons testing by France and China.

== Participants ==
The following nations were represented:

Nation	Name	Position
United Kingdom	Harold Wilson (Chairman)	Prime Minister
Australia	Harold Holt	Prime Minister
Canada	Lester Pearson	Prime Minister
Ceylon	A. F. Wijemanne	Minister of Justice
Cyprus	Makarios III	President
The Gambia	Sir Dawda Jawara	Prime Minister
Guyana	Forbes Burnham	Prime Minister
India	Swaran Singh	Minister of External Affairs
Jamaica	Donald Sangster	Acting Prime Minister
Kenya	Joseph Murumbi	Vice-President
Malawi	Hastings Banda	President
Malaysia	Tunku Abdul Rahman	Prime Minister
Malta	Giorgio Borġ Olivier	Prime Minister
New Zealand	Keith Holyoake	Prime Minister
Nigeria	Babafemi Ogundipe	High Commissioner
Pakistan	Sharifuddin Pirzada	Minister for Foreign Affairs
Sierra Leone	Sir Albert Margai	Prime Minister
Singapore	Lee Kuan Yew	Prime Minister
Trinidad and Tobago	Patrick Solomon	Minister of Foreign Affairs
Uganda	Milton Obote	Prime Minister
Zambia	Simon Kapwepwe	Minister of Foreign Affairs
