= Commonwealth Prime Ministers' Conference =

Meetings of prime ministers of the Commonwealth

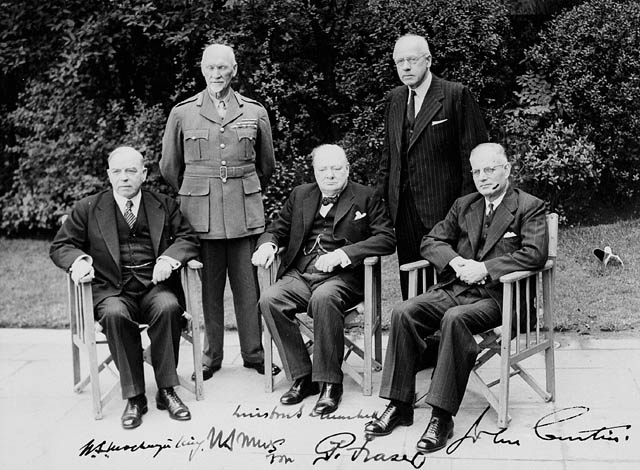
The heads of government of five members of the Commonwealth of Nations at the 1944 Commonwealth Prime Ministers' Conference (L-R: King, Smuts, Churchill, Fraser, Curtin)

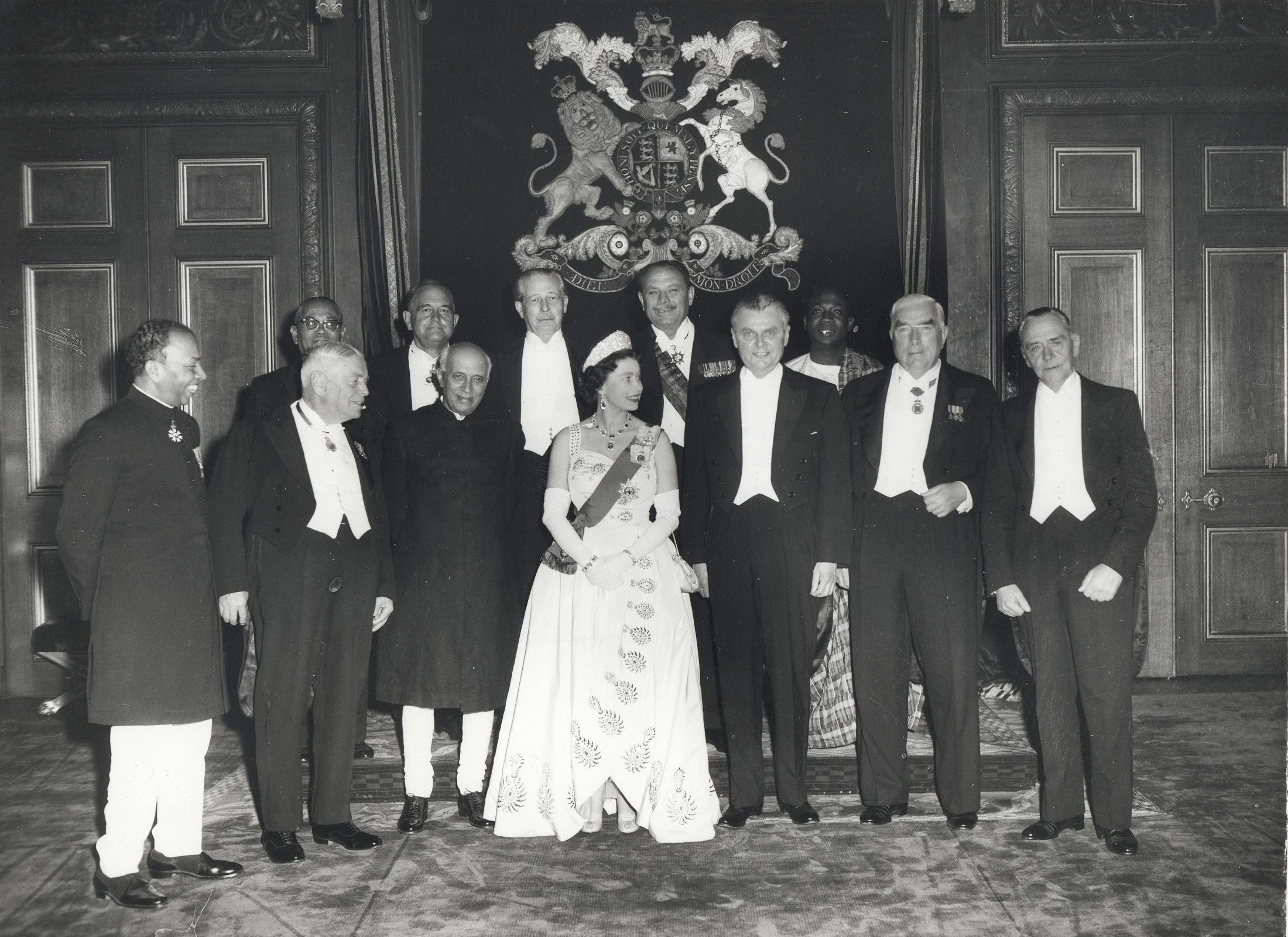
Queen Elizabeth II and Commonwealth leaders, at the 1960 conference, Windsor Castle.

Commonwealth Prime Ministers' Conferences were biennial meetings of Prime Ministers of the United Kingdom and the Dominion members of the British Commonwealth of Nations. Seventeen Commonwealth Prime Ministers' Conferences were held between 1944 and 1969. The prime ministers also met for a Commonwealth Economic Conference in 1952. These conferences were a continuation and regularisation of the earlier Imperial Conferences which had been held periodically from 1887 to 1937. Since 1971, Commonwealth Heads of Government Meetings have been held.

Of the seventeen meetings, sixteen were held in London, reflecting then-prevailing views of the Commonwealth as the continuation of the British Empire and the centralisation of power in the British Commonwealth Office (the one meeting outside London, in Lagos, was an extraordinary meeting held in January 1966 to coordinate policies towards Rhodesia). Two supplementary meetings were also held during this period: a Commonwealth Statesmen's meeting to discuss peace terms in April 1945, and a Commonwealth Economic Conference in 1952.

The first British Commonwealth Prime Ministers' Conference was held 1–16 May 1944 in order to coordinate the war effort. In attendance were:

Australia	John Curtin
Canada	William Lyon Mackenzie King
New Zealand	Peter Fraser
(Union of South Africa) South Africa	Jan Smuts
United Kingdom	Winston Churchill

The British Commonwealth leaders agreed to support the Moscow Declaration and reached agreement regarding their respective roles in the overall Allied war effort.

Conferences consisted of the prime ministers or presidents of independent states as well as the premiers of some senior colonies. This policy changed with the 1964 Prime Ministers' Conference which was confined to independent states and thus excluded Southern Rhodesia, whose prime ministers had attended Imperial and Commonwealth conferences since the 1930s. While the growing number of Commonwealth states was given as the reason for this change, it coincided with the emergence of white minority rule in Rhodesia as a major issue.

The 1960s saw an overhaul of the Commonwealth. The swift expansion of the Commonwealth after decolonisation saw the newly independent countries demand the creation of the Commonwealth Secretariat, and the United Kingdom, in response, successfully founding the Commonwealth Foundation. This decentralisation of power demanded a reformulation of the meetings. Instead of the meetings always being held in London, they would rotate across the membership, subject to countries' ability to host the meetings: beginning with Singapore in 1971. They were also renamed the Commonwealth Heads of Government Meetings to reflect the growing diversity of the constitutional structures in the Commonwealth.

== List of meetings ==
Year	Date	Country	Location	Chairperson
1944	1 May 1944 – 16 May 1944	United Kingdom	London	Winston Churchill
1946	23 April 1946 – 25 May 1946	United Kingdom	London	Clement Attlee
1948	11–22 October 1948	United Kingdom	London	Clement Attlee
1949	22–29 April 1949	United Kingdom	London	Clement Attlee
1951	2–12 January 1951	United Kingdom	London	Clement Attlee
1952	28 November – 12 December 1952	United Kingdom	London	Winston Churchill
1953	3–9 June 1953	United Kingdom	London	Winston Churchill
1955	31 January – 9 February 1955	United Kingdom	London	Winston Churchill
1956	27 June – 6 July 1956	United Kingdom	London	Anthony Eden
1957	26 June – 5 July 1957	United Kingdom	London	Harold Macmillan
1960	3–13 May 1960	United Kingdom	London	Harold Macmillan
1961	8–17 March 1961	United Kingdom	London	Harold Macmillan
1962	10–19 September 1962	United Kingdom	London	Harold Macmillan
1964	8–15 July 1964	United Kingdom	London	Alec Douglas-Home
1965	17–25 June 1965	United Kingdom	London	Harold Wilson
1966 (Jan.)	10–12 January 1966	Nigeria	Lagos	Abubakar Tafawa Balewa
1966 (Sep.)	6–15 September 1966	United Kingdom	London	Harold Wilson
1969	7–15 January 1969	United Kingdom	London	Harold Wilson

== See also ==
- Imperial Conference
- Imperial War Cabinet
- List of Allied World War II conferences
