= 1946 Commonwealth Prime Ministers' Conference =

2nd Commonwealth Prime Ministers' Conference
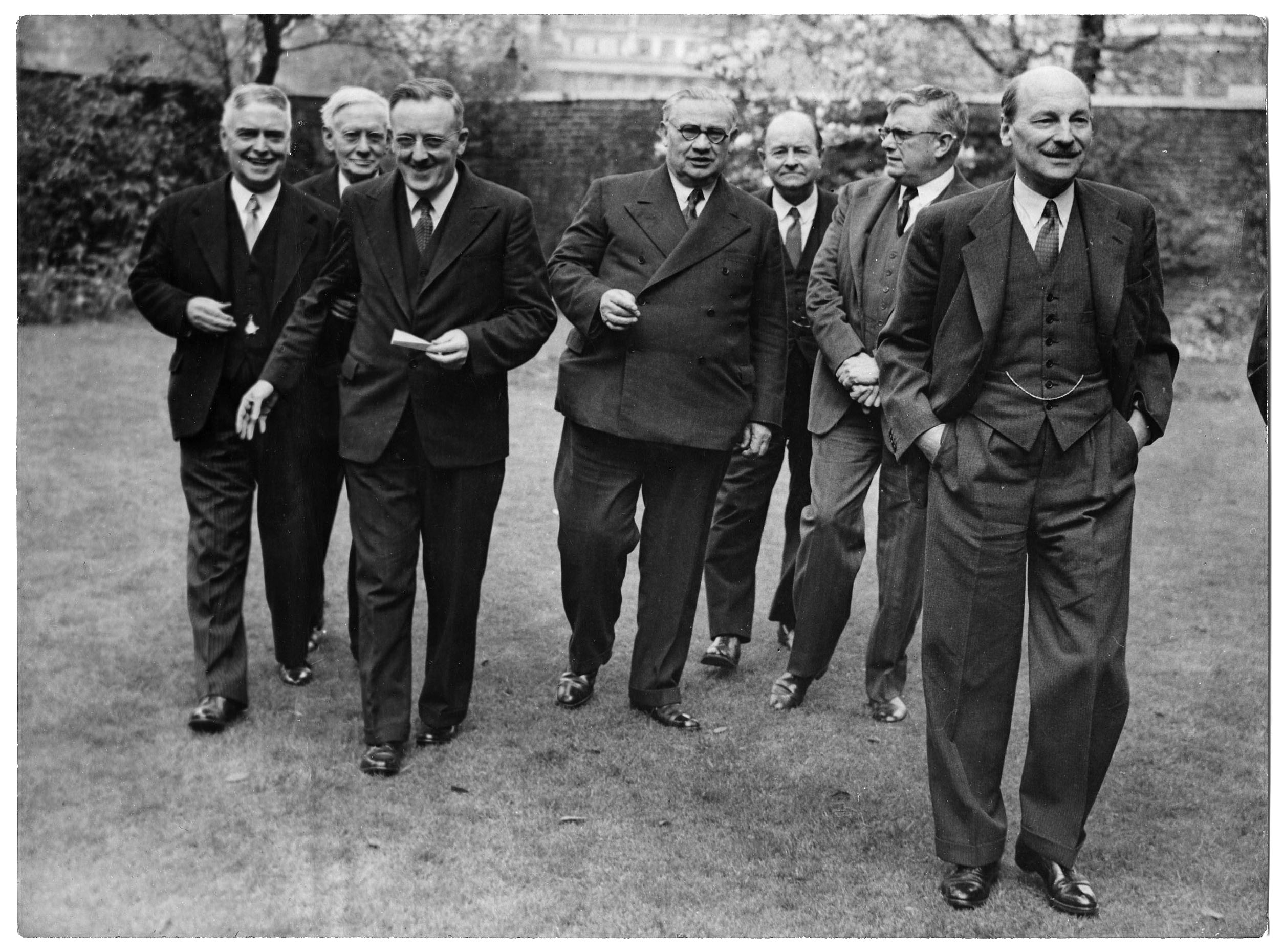
- Host country: United Kingdom
- Dates: 23 April 1946– 25 May 1946
- Cities: London
- Participants: 5
- Chair: Clement Attlee (Prime Minister of the United Kingdom)
- Follows: 1944
- Precedes: 1948

Key points
- Post-war settlement and peace treaties, Commonwealth security arrangements, United Nations

The 1946 Commonwealth Prime Ministers' Conference was the second Meeting of the Heads of Government of the British Commonwealth. It was held in the United Kingdom from April to May 1946, and was hosted by British Prime Minister, Clement Attlee.

Discussions were primarily related to political and economic settlements arising from the end of World War II. The final communiqué expressed the Commonwealth's support for the creation of the United Nations as "a foundation of peace and security, but also as a means of promoting economic progress and social welfare".

This was the final Prime Ministers' Conference consisting only of the 'Old Commonwealth' of majority-white nations and white-minority ruled South Africa.

Ireland did not participate although at the time the British Commonwealth still regarded Ireland as one of its members. Neutral Ireland considered it inappropriate to attend on the basis that the Conference was "discussing matters relating to the war". Ireland had not participated in any equivalent conferences since 1932.

== Participants ==
Nation	Name	Portfolio
United Kingdom	Clement Attlee	Prime Minister (chairman)
Australia	Ben Chifley	Prime Minister
Canada	William Lyon Mackenzie King	Prime Minister
New Zealand	Walter Nash	Deputy Prime Minister
South Africa	Jan Smuts	Prime Minister
