= Funeral of Liaquat Ali Khan =

1951 funeral of the first prime minister of Pakistan

- Part of the aftermath of the assassination of Liaquat Ali Khan
- Date: 17 October 1951; 74 years ago
- Venue: Karachi Polo Ground, Karachi, Pakistan

Liaquat Ali Khan, the first prime minister of Pakistan, was buried in Karachi on 17 October 1951, one day after he was assassinated while addressing a public meeting in Rawalpindi. His body was flown from Rawalpindi to Karachi, then the capital of Pakistan, on the night of 16 October.

Funeral prayers were held at Karachi Polo Ground, where about a quarter of a million people gathered to pay their respects. The cortege then moved slowly through streets lined with mourners before the burial in Karachi beside the resting place of Muhammad Ali Jinnah. A 41-gun salute was given.

== Background ==
Liaquat Ali Khan had served as Pakistan's first prime minister since independence in 1947. On 16 October 1951, he was shot at close range while addressing a public meeting at Company Bagh in Rawalpindi. He was taken to hospital and given a blood transfusion, but died shortly afterwards.

His assassination created an immediate political crisis in Pakistan, but arrangements were quickly made to transport his body to Karachi for burial the following day.

== Funeral and burial ==
Liaquat's body was flown to Karachi on the night of 16 October 1951. The main public funeral ceremony took place on 17 October 1951 at Karachi Polo Ground. An estimated quarter of a million people were gathered to attend the funeral prayers.

After the prayers, the cortege proceeded slowly toward the burial grounds. Thousands of people lined the route, while cavalry of the Governor-General's bodyguard, wearing scarlet uniforms and carrying lances, accompanied the procession. He was buried in Karachi on the afternoon of 17 October 1951. A 41-gun salute was given in Karachi at the time of burial. He was laid to rest beside Muhammad Ali Jinnah.

== Reaction ==
The assassination and funeral drew condolences from abroad. Jawaharlal Nehru described Liaquat as the dominant figure in Pakistan after Jinnah's death and as a steadying influence on the country. U.S. President Harry S. Truman sent messages of condolence to Begum Liaquat Ali Khan and to Governor-General Khawaja Nazimuddin, describing Liaquat's death as a grievous blow to Pakistan and praising his leadership and statesmanship.

== Legacy ==
Liaquat Ali Khan's funeral was one of the first major state mourning ceremonies in Pakistan's history and marked the burial of the country's first head of government. His grave in Karachi became a site of annual commemoration, and he is widely remembered in Pakistan as Shaheed-i-Millat ("Martyr of the Nation").

== See also ==
- Assassination of Liaquat Ali Khan
- Liaquat Ali Khan
- Begum Ra'ana Liaquat Ali Khan
- Mazar-e-Quaid
