= No independence before majority rule =

Policy adopted by the United Kingdom

No independence before majority rule (abbreviated NIBMAR) was a policy adopted by the British government requiring the implementation of majority rule in a colony, rather than rule by the white colonial minority, before the empire granted independence to its colonies. It was sometimes reinterpreted by some commentators as no independence before majority African rule though this addition was not government policy.

== Rhodesia ==
In particular, the NIBMAR position was advocated with respect to the future status of Rhodesia as an independent state. British prime minister Harold Wilson was pressured into adopting the approach during a conference in London. Wilson was not initially inclined to do so, fearing it would slow the rate at which Rhodesia could be granted independence, but Lester Pearson, the Prime Minister of Canada, formulated a draft resolution committing Wilson to NIBMAR. Wilson defended the policy when it was attacked as disastrous by opposition Conservatives. The accomplishment was short-lived, however, as Wilson continued to extend offers to Ian Smith, the Rhodesian Prime Minister, which Smith ultimately rejected. The UK policy of NIBMAR led Smith's government to declare Rhodesia's independence without British consent.

== See also ==
- January 1966 Commonwealth Prime Ministers' Conference
- September 1966 Commonwealth Prime Ministers' Conference
- Assembly of Representatives (Mandatory Palestine)
