= 1962 Commonwealth Prime Ministers' Conference =

12th Commonwealth Prime Ministers' Conference
- Host country: United Kingdom
- Dates: 10–19 September 1962
- Cities: London
- Participants: 16
- Chair: Harold Macmillan (Prime Minister)
- Follows: 1961
- Precedes: 1964

Key points
- British negotiations to enter EEC and impact on Commonwealth trade,

The 1962 Commonwealth Prime Ministers' Conference was the 12th Meeting of the Heads of Government of the Commonwealth of Nations. It was held in the United Kingdom in September 1962, and was hosted by British Prime Minister Harold Macmillan.

The meeting saw the expansion of the Commonwealth to include several newly sovereign countries in Africa and the Caribbean.

The main topic of discussion was the British government's negotiations to join the European Economic Community and concerns by Commonwealth nations of the impact of such a move on trade between Britain and the Commonwealth.

== Participants ==
Nation	Name	Portfolio
United Kingdom	Harold Macmillan	Prime Minister (Chairman)
Australia	Robert Menzies	Prime Minister
Canada	John Diefenbaker	Prime Minister
Ceylon	S.P.C. Fernando	Justice Minister
Cyprus	Archbishop Makarios III	President
Ghana	F.K.D. Goka	Finance Minister
India	Jawaharlal Nehru	Prime Minister
Jamaica	Sir Alexander Bustamante	Prime Minister
Malaya	Abdul Razak Hussein	Deputy Prime Minister
New Zealand	Keith Holyoake	Prime Minister
Nigeria	Sir Abubakar Tafawa Balewa	Prime Minister
Pakistan	Ayub Khan	President
Rhodesia and Nyasaland	Sir Roy Welensky	Prime Minister
Sierra Leone	Sir Milton Margai	Prime Minister
Tanganyika	Rashidi Kawawa	Prime Minister
Trinidad and Tobago	Eric Williams	Prime Minister
