= 1952 Commonwealth Prime Ministers' Economic Conference =

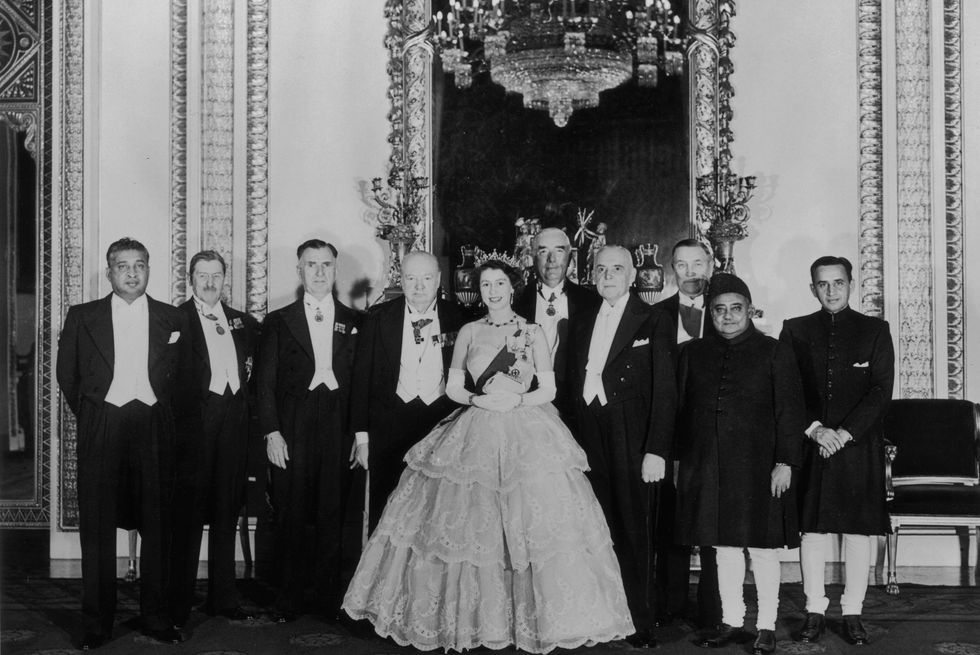
- Photoshoot during the conference
- Host country: United Kingdom
- Dates: 28 November–12 December 1952
- Cities: London
- Participants: 8
- Chair: Winston Churchill (Prime Minister)
- Follows: 1951
- Precedes: 1953

Key points
- Commonwealth trade, imperial preference, Sterling area, ANZUS Treaty, Royal Styles and Titles, Head of the Commonwealth

The 1952 Commonwealth Prime Ministers' Economic Conference was an emergency Meeting of the Heads of Government of the British Commonwealth. It was called by the British government of Sir Winston Churchill and held in the United Kingdom in December 1952 as a follow-up to a Commonwealth Finance Minister's conference held in January 1952. The conference was held in the context of British economic and military decline and the United States' surging role in the world.

The principal topic of the conference was the convertibility of pound sterling into American dollars, with British concerns that non-sterling Commonwealth countries were "building up sterling balances purely for the sake of converting them into dollars".

Other topics included: the future of the sterling area; and the alleviation of Commonwealth trade restrictions and imperial preference; and the domestic policies of Commonwealth countries. This discussion was necessary as the Commonwealth, with the exception of Canada, had a common pool of gold and dollar reserves. Little was accomplished in the economic discussion with the final communique being described as an "agreement in platitudes".

British concerns at being excluded from the ANZUS military treaty between Australia, New Zealand and the United States were also a topic and were addressed by a communique issued by the prime ministers supporting Britain's demand for a voice in ANZUS.

In addition, Commonwealth prime ministers, after months of discussion on whether the newly ascended Queen Elizabeth II should have a uniform royal style and title throughout the Commonwealth or whether realms should adopt their own styles and titles, it was agreed that each member of the Commonwealth "should use for its own purposes a form of the Royal Style and Titles which suits its own particular circumstances but retains a substantial element which is common to all" and agreed to pass appropriate legislation in their respective parliaments. The prime ministers also agreed to proclaim the new Queen, Elizabeth II, Head of the Commonwealth in succession of her late father, George VI.

== Participants ==
Nation	Name	Portfolio
United Kingdom	Winston Churchill	Prime Minister (Chairman)
Australia	Robert Menzies	Prime Minister
Ceylon	Dudley Senanayake	Prime Minister
India	Sir Chintaman Deshmukh	Finance Minister
New Zealand	Sidney Holland	Prime Minister
Pakistan	Sir Khawaja Nazimuddin	Prime Minister
Southern Rhodesia	Sir Godfrey Huggins	Prime Minister
South Africa	Nicolaas Havenga	Finance Minister
