= 1953 Commonwealth Prime Ministers' Conference =

6th Commonwealth Prime Ministers' Conference
- Host country: United Kingdom
- Dates: 3–9 June 1953
- Cities: London
- Participants: 9
- Chair: Sir Winston Churchill (Prime Minister)
- Follows: 1952
- Precedes: 1955

Key points
- Coronation of Elizabeth II, Cold War, Korean armistice talks, Suez Canal, economic development.

The 1953 Commonwealth Prime Ministers' Conference was the sixth Meeting of the Heads of Government of the Commonwealth of Nations. It was held in the United Kingdom in June 1953 on the occasion of the coronation of Queen Elizabeth II, and was hosted by British Prime Minister, Sir Winston Churchill.

The meeting was held prior to the Three-Power Conference between Churchill, US President Dwight Eisenhower, and French Prime Minister Joseph Laniel in Bermuda, which Commonwealth leaders hoped would lead to a Four Powers summit with the Soviet Union. Armistice talks to conclude the Korean War were also discussed. Concerns about the security of the Suez Canal and the importance of maintaining British military installations were also discussed (see Suez War), as were the economic situation and the objectives for development and strengthening of the sterling area set out at the 1952 Commonwealth Prime Ministers' Economic Conference.

== Participants ==
Nation	Name	Portfolio
United Kingdom	Sir Winston Churchill	Prime Minister (chairman)
Australia	Robert Menzies	Prime Minister
Canada	Louis St. Laurent	Prime Minister
Ceylon	Dudley Senanayake	Prime Minister
India	Jawaharlal Nehru	Prime Minister
New Zealand	Sidney Holland	Prime Minister
Pakistan	Muhammad Ali Bogra	Prime Minister
Southern Rhodesia	Sir Godfrey Huggins	Prime Minister
South Africa	Daniel François Malan	Prime Minister
