= 1955 Commonwealth Prime Ministers' Conference =

7th Commonwealth Prime Ministers' Conference
- Host country: United Kingdom
- Dates: 31 January–9 February 1955
- Cities: London
- Participants: 9
- Heads of Government: 8
- Chair: Sir Winston Churchill (Prime Minister)
- Follows: 1953
- Precedes: 1956

Key points
- First Taiwan Strait Crisis, SEATO, international and regional security, trade and development, Pound sterling area

The 1955 Commonwealth Prime Ministers' Conference was the seventh Meeting of the Heads of Government of the Commonwealth of Nations. It was held in the United Kingdom in January 1955 and was hosted by British Prime Minister, Sir Winston Churchill.

A sense of international crisis loomed over the conference, which occurred during which the First Taiwan Strait Crisis, the sudden resignation of Soviet Premier Georgy Malenkov, and the fall of French prime minister Pierre Mendès France, all of which were discussed. Atomic energy for peaceful purposes, disarmament, trade and economic development in the sterling area, and regional defence were also discussed, in particular the defence of South East Asia, the formation of SEATO and the ongoing insurgency in Malaya.

Pakistan informed the meeting that it would become a republic and the meeting affirmed that Pakistan would be welcome to remain in the Commonwealth.

== Participants ==
Nation	Name	Portfolio
United Kingdom	Sir Winston Churchill	Prime Minister (Chairman)
Australia	Robert Menzies	Prime Minister
Canada	Louis St. Laurent	Prime Minister
Ceylon	Sir John Kotelawala	Prime Minister
India	Jawaharlal Nehru	Prime Minister
New Zealand	Sidney Holland	Prime Minister
Pakistan	Mohammad Ali Bogra	Prime Minister
Southern Rhodesia	Sir Godfrey Huggins	Prime Minister
South Africa	Charles Robberts Swart	Deputy Prime Minister and Justice Minister
