= 1965 Commonwealth Prime Ministers' Conference =

14th Commonwealth Prime Ministers' Conference
- Host country: United Kingdom
- Dates: 17–25 June 1965
- Cities: London
- Participants: 21
- Chair: Harold Wilson (Prime Minister)
- Follows: 1964
- Precedes: January 1966

Key points
- Commonwealth peace initiative to Vietnam, race relations, Rhodesia, South Africa, Cyprus, Commonwealth Secretariat

The 1965 Commonwealth Prime Ministers' Conference was the 14th Meeting of the Heads of Government of the Commonwealth of Nations. It was held in the United Kingdom in June 1965, and was hosted by British Prime Minister Harold Wilson.

The conference approved Wilson's proposal for a Commonwealth peace mission to Vietnam; Wilson subsequently shelved the initiative. The body also approved the creation of the Commonwealth Secretariat proposed at the previous summit and appointed Canadian Arnold Smith as the first Commonwealth Secretary-General. The meeting also discussed the crisis in Rhodesia, relations with South Africa and Portuguese colonies in Africa, and opposition by Asian and African Commonwealth countries to British, Australian and New Zealand support for American intervention in the Vietnam War. The Commonwealth reaffirmed its declaration that all Commonwealth states should work for societies based on racial equality.

== Participants ==
Nation	Name	Portfolio
United Kingdom	Harold Wilson	Prime Minister (chairman)
Australia	Robert Menzies	Prime Minister
Canada	Lester Pearson	Prime Minister
Ceylon	A. F. Wijemanne	Justice Minister
Cyprus	Spyros Kyprianou	Foreign Minister
The Gambia	Dawda Jawara	Prime Minister
Ghana	Kwame Nkrumah	President
India	Lal Bahadur Shastri	Prime Minister
Jamaica	Donald Sangster	Acting Prime Minister
Kenya	Joseph Murumbi	Foreign Minister
Malawi	Hastings Banda	Prime Minister
Malaysia	Tunku Abdul Rahman	Prime Minister
Malta	Giorgio Borġ Olivier	Prime Minister
New Zealand	Keith Holyoake	Prime Minister
Nigeria	Sir Abubakar Tafawa Balewa	Prime Minister
Pakistan	Ayub Khan	President
Sierra Leone	Albert Margai	Prime Minister
Tanzania	Julius Nyerere	President
Trinidad and Tobago	Eric Williams	Prime Minister
Uganda	Milton Obote	Prime Minister
Zambia	Kenneth Kaunda	President
