= January 1966 Commonwealth Prime Ministers' Conference =

15th Commonwealth Prime Ministers' Conference
- Host country: Nigeria
- Dates: 10–12 January 1966
- Cities: Lagos
- Participants: 24
- Chair: Abubakar Tafawa Balewa (Prime Minister of Nigeria)
- Follows: 1965
- Precedes: September 1966

Key points
- Rhodesia

The January 1966 Commonwealth Prime Ministers' Conference was the 15th Meeting of the Heads of Government of the Commonwealth of Nations. It was the first such meeting to be held outside of the United Kingdom, being held in Lagos, Nigeria, and was hosted by Nigerian Prime Minister Sir Abubakar Tafawa Balewa.

The sole purpose of the meeting was to discuss the unrecognised white minority ruled Rhodesia and the means by which multi-racial rule could be achieved.

== Participants ==
The following nations were represented:

Nation	Name	Position
United Kingdom	Harold Wilson	Prime Minister
Australia	James Cumes	High Commissioner
Canada	Lester Pearson	Prime Minister
Ceylon	A. F. Wijemanne	Minister of Justice
Cyprus	Makarios III	President
The Gambia	Sir Dawda Jawara	Prime Minister
India	Ashoke Kumar Sen	Minister of Law and Justice
Jamaica	Donald Sangster	Acting Prime Minister
Kenya	James Gichuru	Minister of Finance
Malawi	Hastings Banda	Prime Minister
Malaysia	Abdul Razak Hussein	Deputy Prime Minister
Malta	Giorgio Borġ Olivier	Prime Minister
New Zealand	Sir Tom Macdonald	High Commissioner
Nigeria	Sir Abubakar Tafawa Balewa (Chairman)	Prime Minister
Pakistan	Hakim Μ Ahson	High Commissioner
Sierra Leone	Sir Albert Margai	Prime Minister
Singapore	Lee Kuan Yew	Prime Minister
Trinidad and Tobago	Patrick Solomon	Minister of Foreign Affairs
Uganda	Milton Obote	Prime Minister
Zambia	Reuben Kamanga	Vice President
