= 1964 Commonwealth Prime Ministers' Conference =

13th Commonwealth Prime Ministers' Conference
- Host country: United Kingdom
- Dates: 8–15 July 1964
- Cities: London
- Participants: 18
- Chair: Sir Alec Douglas-Home (Prime Minister)
- Follows: 1962
- Precedes: 1965

Key points
- Race relations, decolonisation, Southern Rhodesia, Apartheid in South Africa, Cyprus, Commonwealth Secretariat, Indonesia–Malaysia confrontation

The 1964 Commonwealth Prime Ministers' Conference was the 13th Meeting of the Heads of Government of the Commonwealth of Nations. It was held in the United Kingdom in July 1964, and was hosted by British Prime Minister Sir Alec Douglas-Home.

With the collapse of the Federation of Rhodesia and Nyasaland, the Commonwealth decided to exclude the white minority ruled regime of Southern Rhodesia from the conference for the first time, as it was not an independent state. The conference communique rejected any prospective Unilateral Declaration of Independence by the colony and called for all-party talks to achieve a multi-racial state. The meeting also reaffirmed its opposition to apartheid, and expressed concern about racial strife in British Guiana and the situation in Cyprus. The Commonwealth meeting expressed sympathy for Malaysia in its conflict with Indonesia. The creation of a Commonwealth Secretariat was also proposed.

== Participants ==
Nation	Name	Portfolio
United Kingdom	Sir Alec Douglas-Home	Prime Minister (Chairman)
Australia	Robert Menzies	Prime Minister
Canada	Lester Pearson	Prime Minister
Ceylon	Sirimavo Bandaranaike	Prime Minister
Cyprus	Spyros Kyprianou	Foreign Minister
Ghana	Kwame Nkrumah	President
India	T. T. Krishnamachari	Finance Minister
Jamaica	Donald Sangster	Finance Minister
Kenya	Jomo Kenyatta	Prime Minister
Malawi	Hastings Banda	Prime Minister
Malaysia	Tunku Abdul Rahman	Prime Minister
New Zealand	Keith Holyoake	Prime Minister
Nigeria	Sir Abubakar Tafawa Balewa	Prime Minister
Pakistan	Ayub Khan	President
Sierra Leone	Albert Margai	Prime Minister
Trinidad and Tobago	Eric Williams	Prime Minister
Uganda	Milton Obote	Prime Minister
Tanzania	Julius Nyerere	President
