= 1960 Commonwealth Prime Ministers' Conference =

10th Commonwealth Prime Ministers' Conference
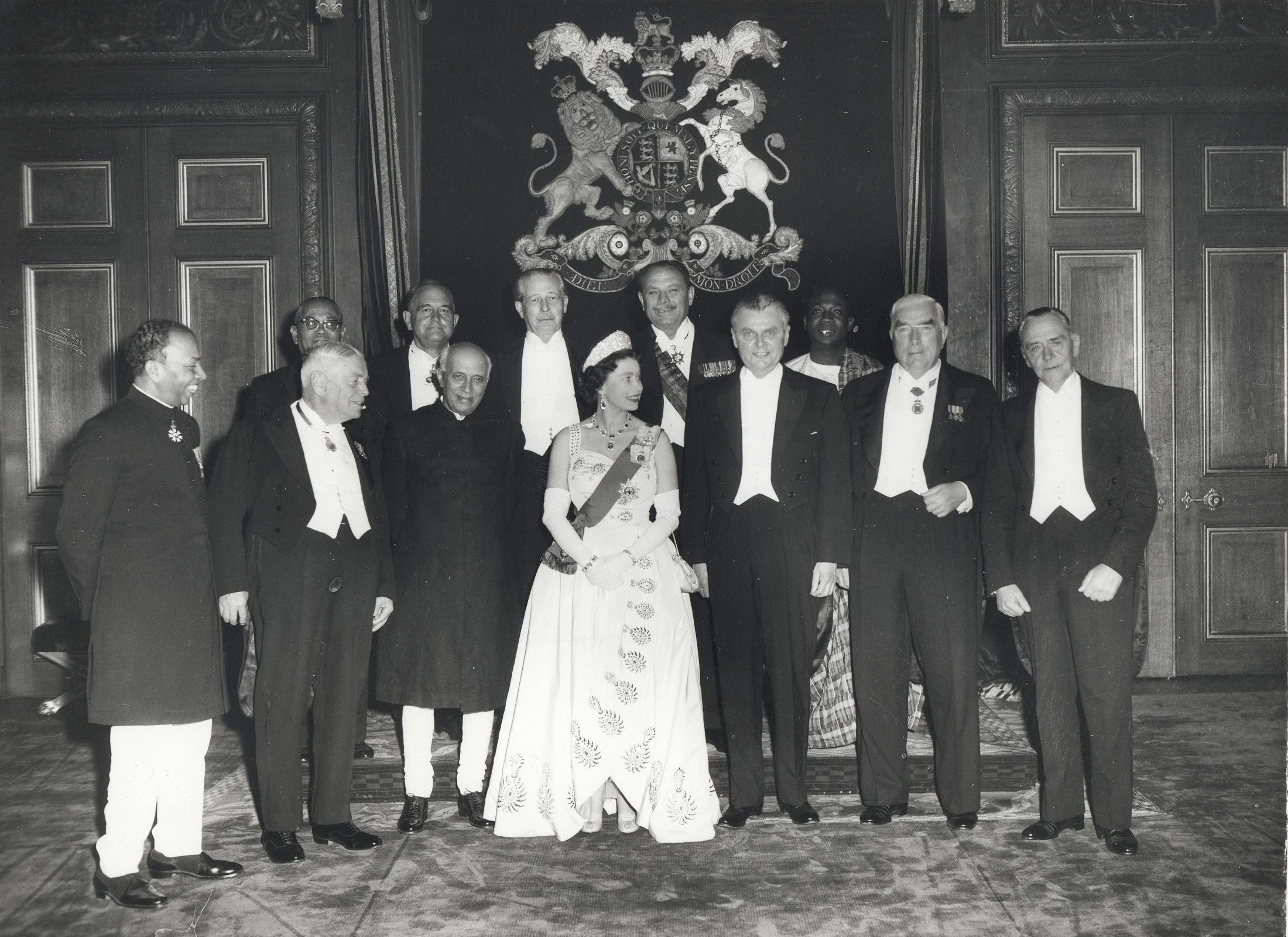
- Host country: United Kingdom
- Dates: 3–13 May 1960
- Cities: London
- Participants: 11
- Chair: Harold Macmillan (Prime Minister)
- Follows: 1957
- Precedes: 1961

Key points
- Apartheid in South Africa

The 1960 Commonwealth Prime Ministers' Conference was the tenth Meeting of the Heads of Government of the Commonwealth of Nations. It was held in the United Kingdom in May 1960, and was hosted by British Prime Minister, Harold Macmillan.

This was the first Commonwealth conference since Malayan independence in August 1957 and saw the growing importance of the non-white "New Commonwealth" countries. Malaya's prime minister, Tunku Abdul Rahman and his government vigorously opposed the apartheid policies of South Africa and, with the support of Pakistan, India and Ghana, demanded that the issue be addressed by the Commonwealth. However, Macmillan insisted that the final communique could only include matters on which the leaders were unanimous. Ghana informed the meeting that it would become a republic whilst South Africa announced that it would be holding a referendum on becoming a republic. Ghana was advised that its continued membership in the Commonwealth as a republic was recognised. South Africa was advised that it would need to seek the consent of other Commonwealth governments for its membership to continue.

== Participants ==
Nation	Name	Portfolio
United Kingdom	Harold Macmillan	Prime Minister (chairman)
Australia	Robert Menzies	Prime Minister
Canada	John Diefenbaker	Prime Minister
Ceylon	Edmund Joseph Cooray	Minister of Justice
Ghana	Kwame Nkrumah	Prime Minister
India	Jawaharlal Nehru	Prime Minister
Malaya	Tunku Abdul Rahman	Prime Minister
New Zealand	Walter Nash	Prime Minister
Pakistan	Ayub Khan	President
Rhodesia and Nyasaland	Sir Roy Welensky	Prime Minister
South Africa	Eric Louw	Minister of External Affairs
