= Liaquat Ali Khan =

Prime Minister of Pakistan from 1947 to 1951

Shaheed-e-Millat Liaquat Ali Khan
- لیاقت علی خان
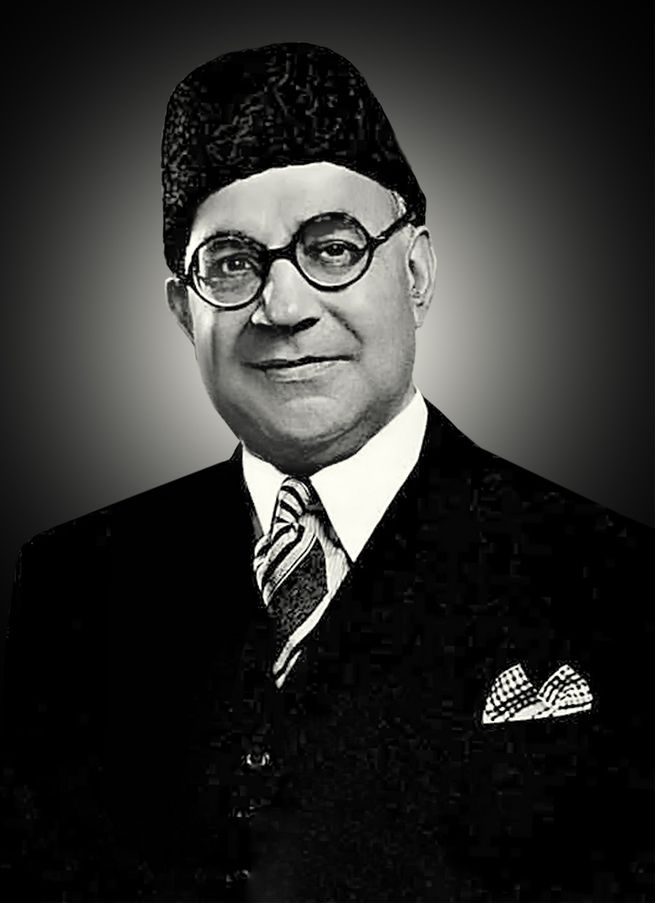
- Official portrait, c. 1945

1st Prime Minister of Pakistan
- In office 15 August 1947 – 16 October 1951
- Monarch: George VI
- Governors-General: Muhammad Ali Jinnah (1947–1948); Khawaja Nazimuddin (1948–1951)
- Preceded by: Position established
- Succeeded by: Khawaja Nazimuddin

1st Minister of Defence
- In office 15 August 1947 – 16 October 1951
- Preceded by: Office established
- Succeeded by: Khawaja Nazimuddin

1st Minister of Foreign Affairs
- In office 15 August 1947 – 27 December 1949
- Deputy: Mohammed Ikramullah
- Preceded by: Office established
- Succeeded by: Muhammad Zafarullah Khan

Minister for Kashmir and Frontier Affairs
- In office 15 August 1947 – 16 October 1951
- Preceded by: Office established
- Succeeded by: Mahmud Hussain

Minister of Finance of British India
- In office 29 October 1946 – 14 August 1947
- Monarch: George VI
- Governors General: Archibald Wavell (1943–1947); Lord Mountbatten (1947)
- Vice President: Jawaharlal Nehru
- Preceded by: Office established
- Succeeded by: Office abolished

President of the Pakistan Muslim League
- In office 11 September 1948 – 17 October 1951
- Preceded by: Muhammad Ali Jinnah
- Succeeded by: Khawaja Nazimuddin

Personal details
- Born: 1 October 1895 Karnal, Punjab, British India (present-day Haryana, India)
- Died: 16 October 1951 (aged 56) Rawalpindi, West Punjab, Pakistan
- Cause of death: Assassination
- Resting place: Mazar-e-Quaid
- Party: All-India Muslim League (1921–1947); Pakistan Muslim League (1947–1951)
- Spouse: Ra'ana Liaquat Ali Khan (m. 1932–1951)
- Children: Wilayat; Akbar; Ashraf
- Education: Aligarh Muslim University (BSc in Political Science); Oxford University (LL.B. in Jurisprudence)

Liaquat Ali Khan (Note: Urdu: لیاقت علی خان) (1 October 1895 – 16 October 1951) was a Pakistani lawyer, politician and statesman who served as the first prime minister of Pakistan from 1947 until his assassination in 1951. He played a key role in consolidating the state of Pakistan, much as Muhammad Ali Jinnah did in founding it. A leading figure in the Pakistan Movement, he is revered as Quaid-e-Millat ("Leader of the Nation") and Shaheed-e-Millat ("Martyr of the Nation").

Khan was born in Karnal, Haryana, to a wealthy Rajput family. His grandfather, Nawab Ahmad Ali, provided significant support to the British during the Mutiny uprising of 1857–1858, earning him substantial rewards in the form of prestigious honours and complete remission of rent. Khan was educated at the Aligarh Muslim University and the University of Oxford. After first being invited to the Indian National Congress, he later opted to join the All-India Muslim League led by Muhammad Ali Jinnah, an Indian independence activist who later advocated for a separate Muslim nation-state out of Hindu-majority India. Khan assisted Jinnah in the campaign for what would become known as the Pakistan Movement and was known as his 'right hand'. He was a democratic political theorist who promoted parliamentarism in British India.

Khan's premiership oversaw the beginning of the Cold War, in which Khan's foreign policy sided with the United States-led Western Bloc over the Soviet Union-led Eastern Bloc. He promulgated the Objectives Resolution in 1949, which stipulated Pakistan to be an Islamic democracy. He also held cabinet portfolio as the first foreign minister, defence minister, and frontier regions minister from 1947 until his assassination in 1951. Prior to the partition of India, Khan briefly tenured as Finance minister of British India in the Interim Government that undertook independence of Pakistan and India, led by Louis Mountbatten, the then-Viceroy of India. In March 1951, he survived an attempted coup by left-wing political opponents and segments of the Pakistani military. While delivering a speech in the Company Bagh of Rawalpindi, Khan was shot dead by an Afghan militant Said Akbar for unknown reasons.

== Early life and education ==
Nawabzada Liaquat Ali Khan was born on 1 October 1895 into a wealthy family belonging to the Mandal clan, in the Karnal, Punjab Province with roots in Talera Village of Jansath Tehsil in Muzaffarnagar District of present day-Uttar Pradesh. He was the second of four sons of the wealthy land owner Rukn-ud-Daulah Shamsher Jung Nawab Bahadur Rustam Ali Khan of Karnal and his wife, Mahmoodah Begum, the daughter of Nawab Quaher Ali Khan of Rajpur, a prominent Rajput family of Saharanpur. He received his early education at home before attending school in Karnal. Khan was instructed in the Qur’an and hadith and was also given music lessons, learning to play the harmonium and flute; in addition, he developed an interest in singing and theatre. From an early age he showed strong religious devotion, choosing to observe the Ramadan fast at the age of four and participating in tazia processions during Muharram, even organizing and leading his own tazia at a young age.

Despite being "courteous, affable and socially popular" and coming from an aristocratic family known for its philanthropy, his biographer Muhammad Reza Kazimi notes that little is known of his early life and that which has to be pieced together from snippets of mostly hagiographic writings. The family claimed a Persian origin going back to Nausherwan the Just, the Sasanian king of Persia, although this may be apocryphal, and were settled in Uttar Pradesh by the time of the birth of his grandfather, Nawab Ahmad Ali Khan. They had adopted the Urdu language. Khan identified as a Punjabi.

According to his family, Khan gained sufficient prestige that the British East India Company recognised him with titles such as Rukun-al-Daulah, Shamsher Jang and Nawab Bahadur, which they say were later inherited by his sons. The validity of those titles has been questioned because the family estates in Uttar Pradesh were diminished as a result of the Indian Rebellion of 1857, after which Uttar Pradesh itself ceased to be an autonomous area. His family had deep respect for the Indian Muslim thinker and philosopher Syed Ahmad Khan, and his father had a desire for young Liaquat Ali Khan to be educated in the British educational system. He was sent to Aligarh Muslim University (AMU), where he earned degrees in law and political science.

In 1913, Khan attended the Muhammadan Anglo-Oriental College (now Aligarh Muslim University), graduating with a BSc degree in Political science and LLB in 1918, and married his cousin, Jehangira Begum, also in 1918, however the couple later separated. At Aligarh, he expanded his range of interests, captaining the cricket team and learning to play chess; he also continued his musical education by studying classical Hindustani vocal music and taking piano lessons. After the death of his father in 1919, he attended Oxford University's Exeter College to pursue his higher education. In 1921, Khan was awarded the Master of Law in Law and Justice, by the college faculty who also conferred on him a Bronze Medallion. While a graduate student at Oxford, Khan actively participated in student unions and was elected Treasurer of the Majlis Society—a student union founded by Indian students to promote the Indian students' rights at the university. He was called to the Bar at the Inner Temple of London in 1922 but never practised.

== Political activism in British India ==
Khan returned to India in 1923, entering in national politics, determined to eradicate what he viewed as the injustice and ill-treatment of Indian Muslims under the British Indian Department and by the British government. His political philosophy strongly emphasised a united India, first gradually believing in Indian nationalism. The Congress leadership approached Khan to become a part of the party, but after attending the meeting with Jawaharlal Nehru, Khan's political views and ambitions gradually changed. Khan refused, informing the Congress Party about his decision, and instead joining the Muslim League in 1923, led under another lawyer Muhammad Ali Jinnah who called for an annual session meeting in May 1924 in Lahore where the goals, boundaries, party programs, vision, and revival of the League, was an initial party agenda and was carefully discussed at the Lahore caucus. At this meeting, Khan was among those who attended this conference, and recommending the new goals for the party.

=== United Province legislation ===
Khan was elected to the provisional legislative council in the 1926 elections from the rural Muslim constituency of Muzaffarnagar. Khan embarked his parliamentary career, representing the United Provinces at the Legislative Council in 1926. In 1932, he was unanimously elected Deputy President of UP Legislative Council.

During this time, Khan intensified his support for Muslim-dominated populations, often raising the problems and challenges faced by the Muslim communities in the United Province. Khan joined academician Sir Ziauddin Ahmed, taking to organise the Muslim students' communities into one student union, advocating for the provisional rights of the Muslim state. His strong advocacy for Muslims' rights had brought him into national prominence and significant respect was also gained from Hindu communities whom he fought for at higher levels of the government. Khan remained the elected member of the UP Legislative Council until 1940, when he was elected to the Central Legislative Assembly; he participated actively, and was the influential member in legislative affairs, where his recommendations would also be noted by other members.

During his parliamentary career, Khan established his reputation as "eloquent, principled and honest spokesman" who would never compromise on his principles even in the face of severe odds. Khan, on several occasions, used his influence and good offices for the resolution of communal tension.

=== Joining the Muslim League ===
Khan rose to become one of the influential members of the Muslim League and was one of the central figures in the Muslim League delegation that attended the National Convention held at Calcutta. Earlier, the British Government had formed the Simon Commission to recommend the constitutional and territorial reforms to the British Government. The commission, compromising seven British Members of Parliament, headed under its Chairman Sir John Simon, met briefly with the Congress Party and Muslim League leaders. The commission had introduced the system of dyarchy to govern the provinces of British India, but these revisions met with harsh criticism and clamour by the Indian public. Motilal Nehru presented his Nehru Report to counter British charges.

In December 1928, Khan and Jinnah decided to discuss the Nehru Report. In 1930, Khan and Jinnah attended the First Round Table Conference which ended in disaster, leading Jinnah to depart from British India to the UK. In 1932, Khan married for a second time to Begum Ra'ana who was a prominent economist and academic who became an influential figure in the Pakistan movement.

In his party presidential address delivered at the Provisional Muslim Education Conference at AMU in 1932, Khan expressed the view that Muslims had "distinct [c]ulture of their own and had the (every) right to persevere it". At this conference, Khan announced that:

"But, days of rapid communalism, in this country (British India) are numbered.., and we shall ere witnessed long the united Hindu-Muslim India anxious to persevere and maintain all that rich and valuable heritage which the contact of two great cultures bequeathed us. We all believe in the great destiny of our common motherland to achieve which common assets are but invaluable."

Soon, he and his new wife departed to England but did not terminate his connections with the Muslim League. With Khan departing, the Muslim League's parliamentary wing disintegrated, with many Muslim members joining the either Democratic Party, originally organised by Khan in 1930, and the Congress Party. At the deputation in England, Khan made close study of organising the political parties and would soon return to his country with Jinnah.

In 1930, Jinnah urged Prime Minister Ramsay MacDonald and his Viceroy Lord Irwin to convene a Round Table Conferences in London. In spite of what Jinnah was expecting, the conference was a complete failure, forcing Jinnah to retire from national politics and permanently settle in London and practise law before the Privy Council.

During this time, Khan and his wife joined Jinnah, with Khan practising economic law and his wife joining the faculty of economics at the local college. The couple spent most of their time convincing Jinnah to return to British India to unite the scattered Muslim League mass into one full force. Meanwhile, Choudhry Rahmat Ali coined the term Pakistan in his famous pamphlet Now or Never; Are We to Live or Perish Forever?

=== Pakistan Movement ===
In 1930, Jinnah, along with his sister Fatima and daughter Dina, decided to settle in London. When the Muslim India and the All India Muslim League became a divided house, Liaquat and his wife Ra'na went to England and met with Jinnah and his family in July 1933 at their Hampstead residence in London. There they convinced him to return to India to save the Muslims from further division. Jinnah returned to India in December 1934 and started to reorganize the All-India Muslim League. In 1936, the annual session of the League met in Bombay (now Mumbai). In the open session on 12 April 1936, Jinnah moved a resolution proposing Khan as the Honorary General Secretary. The resolution was unanimously adopted and he held the office until the establishment of Pakistan in 1947. In 1940, Khan was made the deputy leader of the Muslim League Parliamentary party. Jinnah was not able to take active part in the proceedings of the Assembly due to his heavy political workload. Khan stood in his place.

During this period, Khan was also the Honorary General Secretary of the Muslim League, the deputy leader of their party, Convenor of the Action Committee of the Muslim League, Chairman of the Central Parliamentary Board and the managing director of the newspaper Dawn. The Pakistan Resolution was adopted in 1940 at the Lahore session of the Muslim League. The same year elections were held for the central legislative assembly which were contested by Khan from the Barielly constituency. He was elected without contest. When the twenty-eighth session of the League met in Madras (now Chennai) on 12 April 1941, Jinnah told party members that the ultimate aim was to obtain Pakistan. In this session, Khan moved a resolution incorporating the objectives of the Pakistan Resolution in the aims and objectives of the Muslim League. The resolution was seconded and passed unanimously.

Khan (second left, first row) and his wife, Ra'ana (far right, first row), meeting with Nawab Muhammad Farid Khan of Amb, 1948.

In 1945–46, mass elections were held in India and Khan won the Central Legislature election from the Meerut Constituency in the United Provinces. He was also elected Chairman of the League's Central Parliamentary Board. The Muslim League won 87% of seats reserved for Muslims of British India. He assisted Jinnah in his negotiations with the members of the Cabinet Mission and the leaders of the Congress during the final phases of the Freedom Movement and it was decided that an interim government would be formed consisting of members of the Congress, the Muslim League and minority leaders. When the Government asked the Muslim League to send five nominees for representation in the interim government, Khan was asked to lead the League group in the cabinet. He was given the portfolio of finance. The other four men nominated by the League were Ibrahim Ismail Chundrigar, Ghazanfar Ali Khan, Abdur Rab Nishtar, and Jogendra Nath Mandal. By this point, the British government and the Indian National Congress had both accepted the idea of Pakistan, which came into existence on 14 August 1947.

== Prime Minister of Pakistan (1947–1951) ==
After independence, Khan was appointed the first Prime Minister of Pakistan by the founding fathers of Pakistan. The country was born during the beginning of the extensive competition between the two world superpowers, the United States and Soviet Union. Khan faced with mounted challenges and difficulties while trying to administer the country. Khan and the Muslim League faced dual competitions with socialists in West-Pakistan and, the communists in East Pakistan. The Muslim League found it difficult to compete with socialists in West Pakistan, and lost considerable support in favor of socialists led by Marxist leader Faiz Ahmad Faiz. In East Pakistan, the Muslim League's political base was eliminated by both the newly-formed All-Pakistan Awami League led by Huseyn Shaheed Suhrawardy and the Communist Party of Pakistan led by Sajjad Zaheer. On the internal front, Khan, faced with socialist nationalist challenges and different religious ideologies saw the country fall into more unrest. Problems with Soviet Union and Soviet bloc further escalated after Khan failed to make a visit to Soviet Union, despite his intentions. Khan envisioned a non-aligned foreign policy, however despite some initiatives, the country became more dependent on the United States and this ultimately influenced Khan's policy towards the Western bloc.

His government faced serious challenges including the dispute over Kashmir with India, forcing Khan to approach his counterpart the Prime Minister of India Jawaharlal Nehru. A settlement was reached to end the fighting, while Nehru also referred the issue to the United Nations. Ali Khan sent the recommendation to Jinnah to appoint Abdul Rashid as the country's first Chief Justice, and Justice Abdur Rahim as President of the Constitutional Assembly, both of them were also founding fathers of Pakistan. Some of the earliest reforms Khan took were to centralise the Muslim League, and he planned and prepared the Muslim League to become the leading authority of Pakistan.

The Daily Times, a leading English-language newspaper, held Khan responsible for mixing religion and politics, pointing out, "Liaquat Ali Khan had no constituency in the country, his hometown was left behind in India. Bengalis were a majority in the newly created state of Pakistan and this was a painful reality for him". According to the Daily Times, Khan and his legal team restrained from writing down the constitution, the reason being simple: The Bengali demographic majority would have been granted political power and, Liaquat Ali Khan would have been sent out of the prime minister's office. The Secularists also held him responsible for promoting the Right-wing political forces controlling the country in the name of Islam and further politicised the Islam, despite its true nature.

=== Economy ===
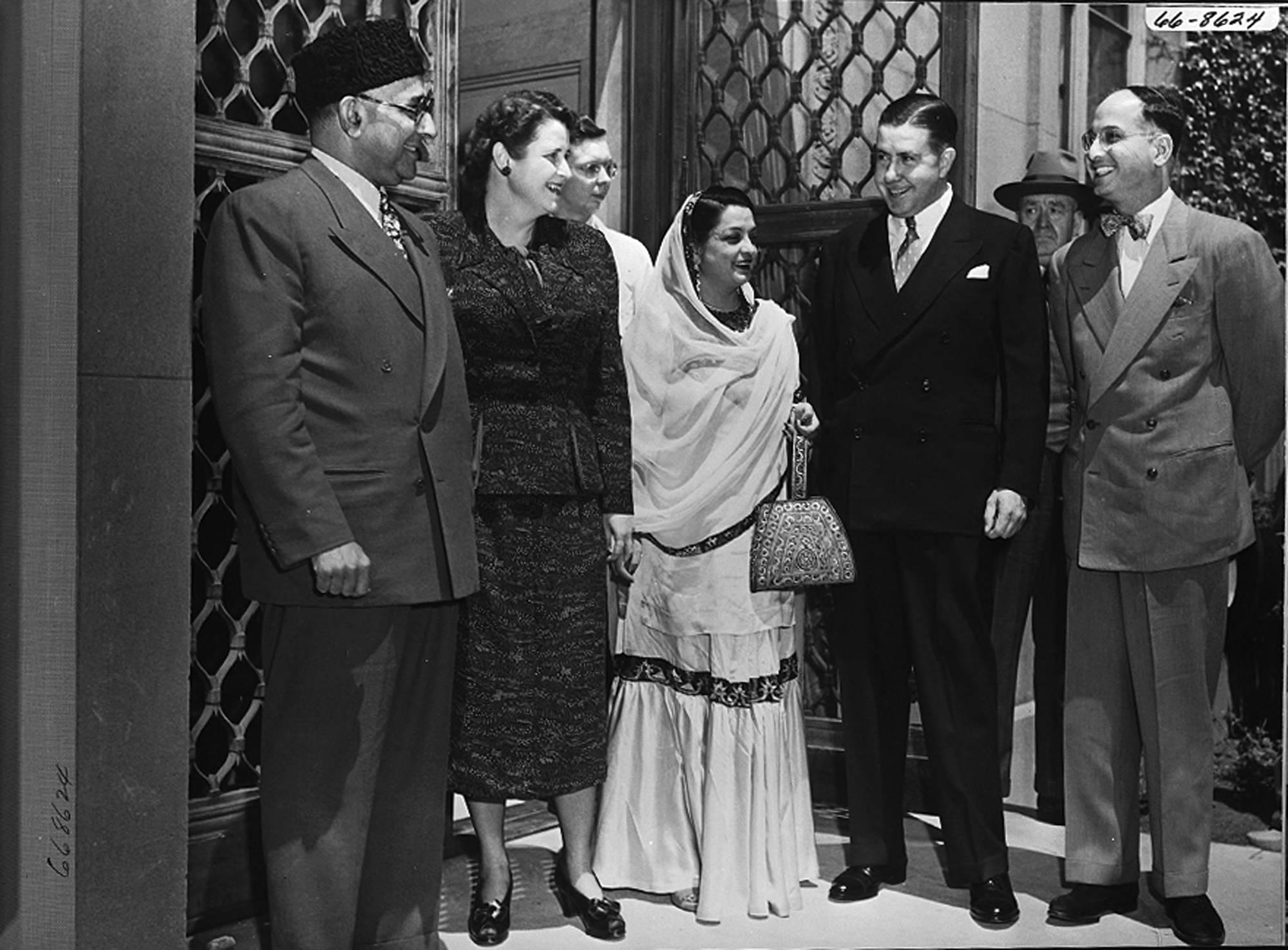
Khan with faculty members of the Massachusetts Institute of Technology, May 1950

In 1947, Khan and his Finance minister Malik Ghulam Muhammad proposed the idea of Five-Year Plans, by putting the country's economic system on investment and capitalism grounds. Focusing on an initial planned economic system under the directives of private sector and consortium industries in 1948, economic planning began to take place during his time in office, but soon collapsed partly because of unsystematic and inadequate staffing. Khan's economic policies were soon heavily dependent on United States aid to the country. In spite of planning an independent economic policy, Khan's economic policies focused on the United States' aid programme, on the other hand, Nehru focused on socialism and went on to be a part of Non Aligned Movement. An important event during his premiership was the establishment of a National Bank in November 1949, and the installation of a paper currency mill in Karachi. Unlike his Indian counterpart Jawaharlal Nehru, under Khan Pakistan's economy was planned, but also an open free market economy.

=== Education ===
Khan took initiatives to develop educational infrastructure, science and technology in the country, with the intention of carrying the vision of successful development of science and technology to aid the essential foreign policy of Pakistan. In 1947, with Jinnah inviting physicist Rafi Muhammad Chaudhry to Pakistan, Liaquat Ali Khan called upon chemist Salimuzzaman Siddiqui, awarding him citizenship, and appointing him as his first government science adviser in 1950. Khan called physicist and mathematician Raziuddin Siddiqui, asking him to plan and establish educational research institutes in the country. Khan asked Ziauddin Ahmed to draft the national educational policy, which was submitted to his office in November 1947, and a road map to establishing education in the country was quickly adopted by Khan's government. Khan's government authorised the establishment of the Sindh University. Under his government, science infrastructure was slowly built but he continued inviting Muslim scientists and engineers from India to Pakistan, believing it essential for Pakistan's future progress.

=== Constitutional reforms ===
During his early days in office, Khan first adopted the Government of India Act 1935 to administer the country, although his lawmakers and legislators continued to work on a different document of governance. Finally in 1949 after Jinnah's death, Prime Minister Khan intensified his vision to establish an Islamic-based system in the country, presenting the Objectives Resolution—a prelude to future constitutions, in the Constituent Assembly. The house passed it on 12 March 1949, but it was met with criticism from his Law Minister Jogendra Nath Mandal who argued against it. Severe criticism were also raised by MP Ayaz Amir On the other hand, Liquat Ali Khan described as this bill as the "Magna Carta" of Pakistan's constitutional history. Khan called it "the most important occasion in the life of this country, next in importance, only to the achievement of independence". Under his leadership, a team of legislators also drafted the first report of the Basic Principle Committee and work began on the second report.

=== Foreign policy ===
==== Kashmir dispute ====
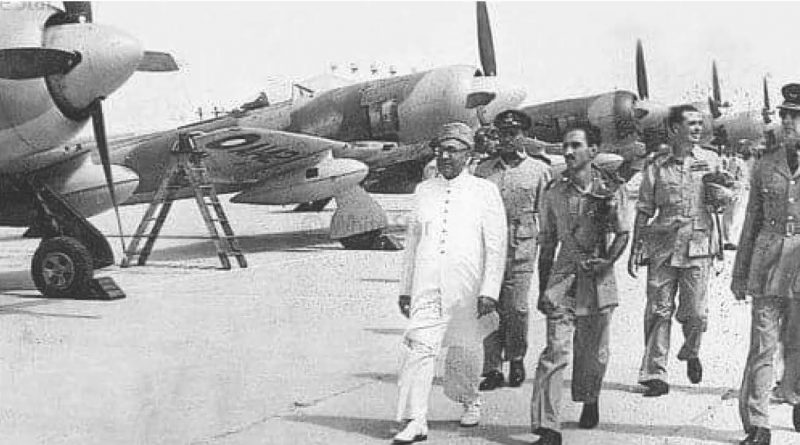
Khan inspecting the Royal Pakistan Air Force's fleet at the RPAF Station Mauripur in Karachi—accompanied by RPAF Commander-in-Chief Richard Atcherley and Wing Commander Nur Khan—during Independence Day celebrations, 1950

At a meeting of the Partition Council, Khan had rejected an offer from Vallabhbhai Patel regarding Kashmir and Hyderabad State. Patel had offered Kashmir to Pakistan in exchange for Pakistan relinquishing its claim to Hyderabad. Ali rejected this offer, preferring to keep Hyderabad, ignoring that the distance between the two would prevent Hyderabad's accession to Pakistan in any case. Pakistani statesman Shaukat Hayat Khan resigned in protest of this folly; Hyderabad went to India anyway after the two nations went to war over Kashmir.

Soon after appointing a new government, Pakistan entered a war with India over Kashmir. The British commander of the Pakistan Army General Sir Frank Walter Messervy refused to attack the Indian army units. When General Douglas Gracey was appointed the commander in chief of the Pakistan Army, Liaquat Ali Khan ordered the independent units of the Pakistan Army to intervene in the conflict. On the Kashmir issue, Khan and Jinnah's policy reflected "Pakistan's alliance with [the] U.S and United Kingdom" against "Indian imperialism" and "Soviet expansion". However, it is revealed by historians that differences and disagreement with Jinnah arose over the Kashmir issue. Jinnah's strategy to liberate Kashmir was to use military force. Thus, Jinnah's strategy was to "kill two birds with one stone", namely decapitate India by controlling Kashmir, and to find a domestic solution through foreign and military intervention.

Regarding Khan's personal accounts and views, the prime minister preferred a "harder diplomatic" and "less military stance". The prime minister sought a dialogue with his counterpart, and agreed to resolve the dispute of Kashmir in a peaceful manner through the efforts of the United Nations. According to this agreement a ceasefire was effected in Kashmir on 1 January 1949. It was decided that a free and impartial plebiscite would be held under the supervision of the UN. The prime minister's diplomatic stance was met with hostility by the Pakistan Armed Forces and the socialists and communists, notably the mid-higher level command who would later sponsor an alleged coup led by the communists and socialists against his government.

==== Cold War ====
In 1949, the Soviet Union's leader, Joseph Stalin, sent an invitation to Khan to visit the country, followed by a U.S. invitation after they learned of the Soviet move. In May 1950, Khan paid a state visit to the United States after being persuaded to snap ties with the Soviet Union, and set the course of Pakistan's foreign policy toward closer ties with the West, despite it being the Soviet Union who sent its invitation of Khan to visit the country first. The visit further cemented strong ties between the two countries and brought them closer.

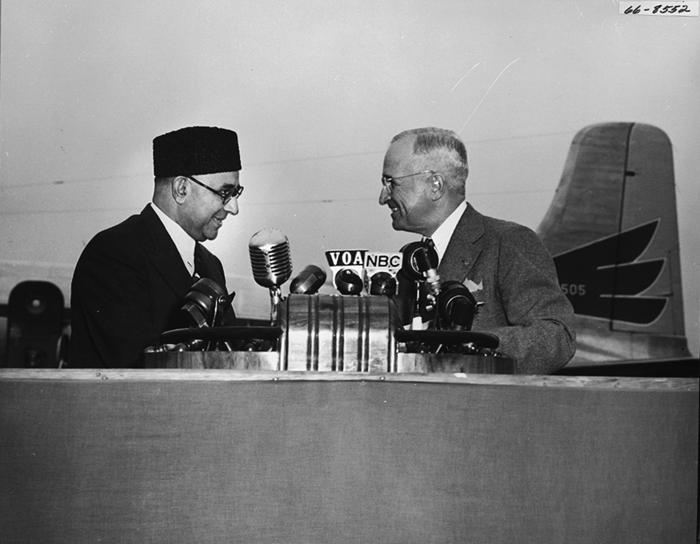
Khan with U.S. President Harry S. Truman in Washington, D.C., May 1950

According to many sources, the policies Khan formulated were focused on Movement of Non-Aligned Countries, and during his trip to the U.S. in 1950, Khan had made clear that Pakistan's foreign policy was neutrality. As a newly born nation with trouble in planning the economy, Khan asked the U.S. for economic and moral support to enable it to stand on its feet. The United States gladly accepted the offer and continued its aid throughout the years. But ties deteriorated after the United States asked Khan to send two combat divisions to support U.S. military operations in the Korean War. Khan wanted to send the divisions but asked the U.S. for assurances on Kashmir, which the U.S. declined to give. Khan decided not to send Pakistani forces to Korea, a clear indication that Pakistan was working towards the Non-Aligned Movement. The United States began work on a policy to keep Pakistan impartial, and India on the other hand, remained a keystone to bringing stability in South Asia. By June and July 1951, Pakistan's relations with U.S. deteriorated further, with Nehru visiting the United States, pressuring Pakistan to recall her troops from Kashmir.

Pakistan cannot afford to wait. She must take her friends where she finds them...!

— Liaquat Ali Khan referring to the Soviet Union and China.,

Khan began to develop tighter relations with the Soviet Union, China, Poland, and Iran under its Prime Minister Mohammed Mossadegh as well. Khan sent invitations to Stalin and the Polish Communist leader Władysław Gomułka to visit Pakistan. However, the visits never happened after Khan was assassinated and Stalin died. In 1948, Pakistan established relations with the Soviet Union, and an agreement was announced a month later. The faltering U.S. trade had frustrated Khan who sent career FSO Jamsheed Marker as Pakistan's Ambassador to the Soviet Union. A few months later, a Soviet ambassador arrived in Pakistan, with a large staff and accompanying military attaches. In 1950, Khan established relations with China by sending his ambassador, making Pakistan the first Muslim country to establish relations with China, a move which further dismayed the United States. While in Iran, Khan spoke with the Soviet Ambassador. Moscow promptly extended an invitation to him to visit the Soviet Union.

==== The Commonwealth ====
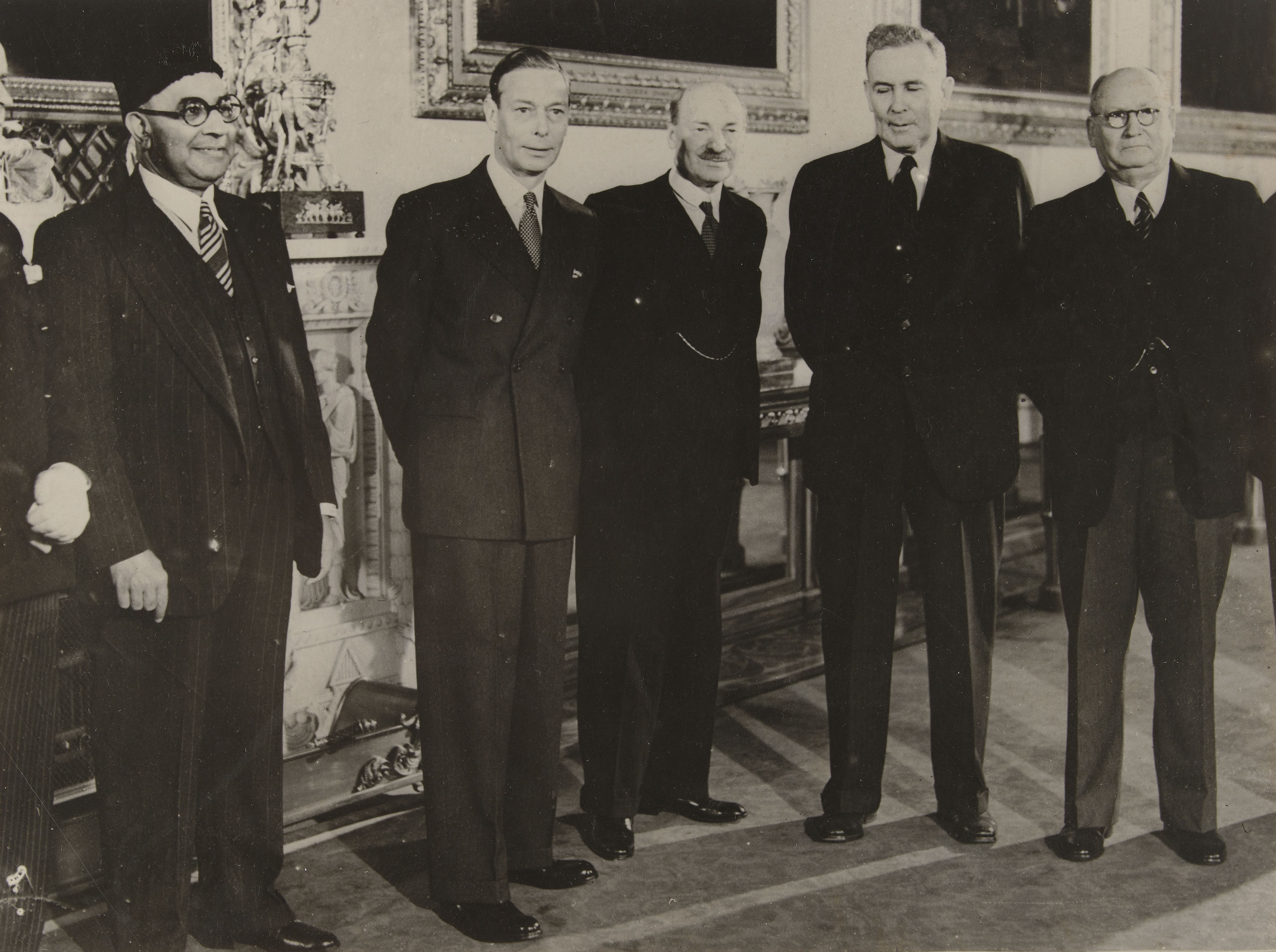
Khan with George VI of the United Kingdom, British Prime Minister Clement Attlee, Australian Prime Minister Ben Chifley, and South African Prime Minister D. F. Malan at the 1951 Commonwealth Prime Ministers' Conference in London

Khan was initially apathetic about Pakistan's membership in the British Commonwealth of Nations due to the attitude of other Commonwealth leaders to the Partition of India. However, he was hopeful that Pakistan's membership would produce benefits, particularly regarding a resolution to the Kashmir dispute with India. For this reason, Khan refused to attend the 1951 Commonwealth Prime Ministers' Conference in London unless the conference would discuss Kashmir.

==== Muslim world ====
Khan was a major supporter of unity within the Islamic world, advocating for the independence of Muslim nations from European colonialism. He provided diplomatic support to Indonesia during the Indonesian National Revolution, declaring a public holiday in Pakistan on the occasion of Indonesia's independence. Furthermore, he visited several countries such as Egypt, Syria, Iraq, and Iran, alongside inviting Mohammad Reza Pahlavi to Pakistan in 1950 on an extensive state visit.

During Khan's premiership, Pakistan's relationship with neighbouring Afghanistan was tense due to the latter's opposition to Pakistan's entry into the United Nations. Afghanistan also supported the Faqir of Ipi, a Pashtun tribal leader who revolted in Waziristan, with the goal of seizing Pashtunistan from Pakistan. In 1951, Khan was assassinated by Sayyid Akbar Babrak, an Afghan national.

=== Domestic struggles ===
Khan's ability to run the country was put in doubt and great questions were raised by the communists and socialists active in the country. In 1947–48 period, Ali Khan-Jinnah relations was contentious, and the senior military leadership and Jinnah himself became critical of Khan's government. In his last months, Jinnah came to believe that his Prime Minister Khan was a weak prime minister—highly ambitious—and not loyal to Jinnah and his vision in his dying days.

The death of Jinnah was announced in 1948, as a new cabinet was also re-established. Ali Khan faced the problem of religious minorities during late 1949 and early 1950, and observers feared that India and Pakistan were about to fight their second war in the first three years of their independence. At this time, Ali Khan met Indian Prime Minister Jawaharlal Nehru to sign the Liaquat-Nehru Pact in 1950. The pact was an effort to improve relations and reduce tension between India and Pakistan, and to protect the religious minorities on both sides of the border.

Khan did not take over the office of Governor-General, instead appointing Khawaja Nazimuddin, a Bengali statesman from East-Pakistan. When Jinnah died, he had held three major positions: Governor-General; President of Muslim League; and the Constituent Assembly of which he served both its president and legal adviser. Although Ali Khan was a legislator and lawyer, he lacked Jinnah's political stature.

Differences and problems also leveled up with the Pakistan Armed Forces, and a local and native section of Pakistan Army was completely hostile towards Ali Khan's diplomatic approach with India. The existence of high level opposition was revealed in the Rawalpindi conspiracy, sponsored by Chief of General Staff Akbar Khan, and headed by communist leader Faiz Ahmad Faiz. Another difference came when Khan also intensified policies to make the country a parliamentary democracy and federal republic. During his tenure, Khan supervised the promulgation of the October Objectives in 1949 which passed by the Constituent Assembly. The document was aimed as an Islamic, democratic and federal constitution and government. Disagreement existed about the approach and methods to realise these aims.

The third major difference was itself in the Muslim League; the party had weak political structure with no public base ground or support. Its activities reveled in high factionalism, low commitment to resolve public problems, corruption and incompetency of planning social and economic programs. In East Pakistan, Ali Khan's lack of attention for the development of the Bengali section of the state brought about a bad juncture for the prime minister and his party, where its ideology was vague. In terms of its political base, it was both weak and narrow, and could not compete in West-Pakistan as well as in East-Pakistan where traditional families were endowed with enormous political power. In West Pakistan, the Muslim League failed to compete against the socialists, and in East Pakistan the communists.

==== 1951 military scandal ====
Khan's relation with General Sir Douglas Gracey deteriorated, prompting General Gracey to retire soon after the conflict. In January 1951, Khan approved the appointment of General Ayub Khan to succeed Gracey as the first native Commander-in-Chief of the Pakistan Army. During this time the socialists gained a significant amount of support. Senior military leaders and prominent socialists plotted to overthrow the government of Ali Khan. Those involved reportedly included Chief of General Staff Major General Akbar Khan and Marxist-socialist politician Faiz Ahmad Faiz, the leaders of the coup plot. The Military Police arrested many in the military services; more than 14 officers were charged for plotting the coup. The Rawalpindi Conspiracy, as it became known, was the first attempted coup in Pakistan's history. The arrested conspirators were tried in secret and given lengthy jail sentences.

== Assassination and funeral ==
On 16 October 1951, Khan was shot twice in the chest while he was addressing a gathering of 100,000 at Company Bagh (Company Gardens), Rawalpindi. The police immediately shot the presumed murderer who was later identified as professional assassin Said Akbar. Khan was rushed to a hospital and given a blood transfusion, but he succumbed to his injuries. Said Akbar Babrak was an Afghan national from the Pashtun Zadran tribe. He was known to Pakistani police prior to the assassination of Liaquat Ali Khan. The exact motive behind the assassination has never been fully revealed and much speculation surrounds it. A major overseas newspaper and an Urdu daily published in Bhopal, India, saw a US hand behind the assassination.

Upon his death, Khan was given the honorific title of Shaheed-e-Millat ("Martyr of the Nation"). After his funeral, he was buried at Mazar-e-Quaid, the mausoleum built for Jinnah in Karachi. The Municipal Park, where he was assassinated, was renamed Liaquat Bagh (Bagh means Garden) in his honor. It is the same location where ex-Prime Minister Benazir Bhutto was assassinated in 2007.

== First cabinet and appointments ==
The Ali Khan Cabinet
Ministerial office	Officer holder	Term
Prime minister	Liaquat Ali Khan	1947–1951
Foreign Affairs	Sir Zafrullah Khan	1947–1954
Treasury, Economic	Malik Ghulam	1947–1954
Law, Justice, Labour	Jogendra Nath Mandal	1947–1951
Interior	Khwaja Shahabuddin	1948–1951
Defence	Iskander Mirza	1947–1954
Science advisor	Salimuzzaman Siddiqui	1951–1959
Education, Health	Fazal Ilahi Chaudhry	1947–1956
Finance, Statistics	Sir Victor Turner	1947–1951
Minorities, Women	Sheila Irene Pant	1947–1951
Communications	Abdur Rab Nishtar	1947–1951

== Legacy ==
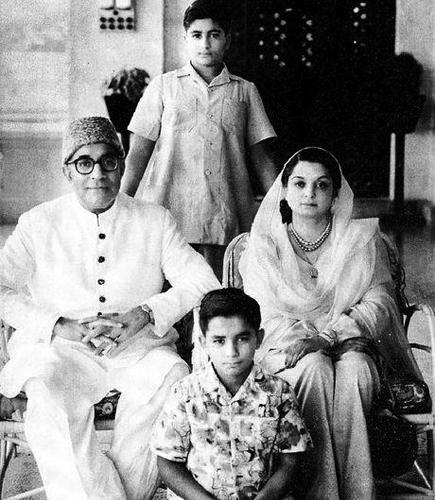
Khan with his family, 1949

Khan is Pakistan's longest serving Prime Minister spending 1,524 days in power. His legacy was built up as a man who was the "martyr for democracy" in the newly founded country. Many in Pakistan saw him as a man who sacrificed his life to preserve the parliamentary system of government. After his death, his wife remained an influential figure in the Pakistani foreign service and was Governor of Sindh Province in the 1970s. Khan's assassination remains unsolved. Popularly, he is known as Quaid-i-Millat (Leader of the Nation) and Shaheed-i-Millat (Martyr of the Nation), by his supporters. His assassination was a first political murder of any civilian leader in Pakistan, and Liaqat Ali Khan is remembered fondly by most Pakistanis. In an editorial written by Daily Jang, the media summed up that "his name will remain shining forever on the horizon of Pakistan".

In Pakistan, Khan is regarded as Jinnah's "right hand man" and heir apparent. His role in filling in the vacuum created by Jinnah's death is seen as decisive in tackling critical problems during Pakistan's fledgling years and in devising measures for the consolidation of Pakistan. After his death, the government of Pakistan released a commemorative stamp and his face is printed on postage stamps across the country. His former personal residence is located at Jansath Tehsil of Muzaffarnagar, Uttar Pradesh about 80 km from his ancestral estate and is now being considered by the Uttar Pradesh government to be opened as a tourist destination.

== Eponyms ==
- Liaquat National Library, Pakistan's largest library and open-source library, named after him.
- Liaquat University of Medical and Health Sciences, medical university established in the memory of Liaquat Ali Khan.
- Liaquat National Hospital, government hospital named after Liaquat Ali Khan.
- Liaquat National Garden, government-owned garden where Liaquat Ali Khan was assassinated.
- Liaquat Pur, census-designated town-city named after Liaquat Ali Khan.
- Liaquat Pur Railway Station, a railway station in Liaquatpur also named after Liaquat Ali Khan.
- Liaquatabad Town, a populated town in Karachi named after Liaquat Ali Khan.

== Assessment of foreign policy ==
Others argue that Khan had wanted Pakistan to remain neutral in the Cold War, as declared three days after Pakistan's independence when he declared that Pakistan would take no sides in the conflict of ideologies between the nations. Former serviceman Shahid M. Amin has argued that the Soviets themselves could not settle convenient dates for a visit, and that, even during his visit to the United States, Liaquat had declared his intention to visit the Soviet Union. Amin also notes that "Failure to visit a country in response to its invitations has hardly ever become the cause of long-term estrangement".

== In popular culture ==
In Pakistan, many documentaries, stage and television dramas have been produced to enlighten Liaqat Ali Khan's struggle. Internationally, Ali Khan's character was portrayed by actor Yousuf "Shakeel" Kamal in the 1998 film Jinnah.

== See also ==
- Conservatism in Pakistan
- Pakistan Muslim League
- History of Pakistan
- List of unsolved murders (1900–1979)
- History of Cold War (1947–1953)
- State within a state
- Pakistani political families
- Sack of Pakistani consulates in Afghanistan 1955

== Notes ==
Political offices
New office	Minister of Finance of India; 1946–1947	Succeeded by Shanmukham Chetty
New office	Prime Minister of Pakistan; 1947–1951	Succeeded by Khawaja Nazimuddin
New office	Minister of Defence of Pakistan; 1947–1951	Succeeded by Khawaja Nazimuddin
New office	Minister of Foreign Affairs of Pakistan; 1947	Succeeded by Muhammad Zafarullah Khan
