= Stolzenfels Castle =

- Schloss Stolzenfels
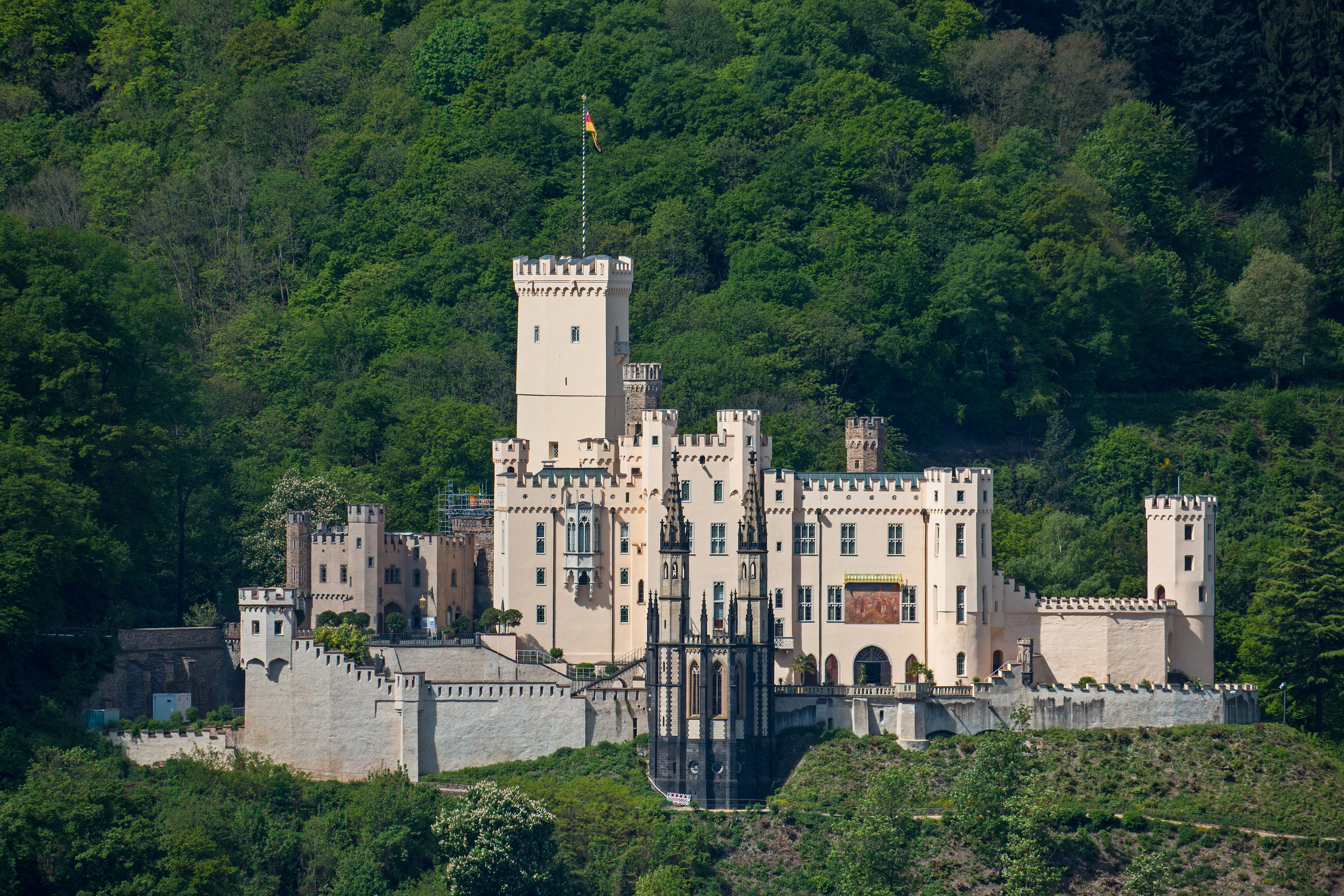
- Stolzenfels Castle

- Location within Rhineland-Palatinate Stolzenfels Castle (Germany)

General information
- Type: Schloss
- Architectural style: Gothic Revival
- Location: Koblenz, Germany
- Coordinates: 50.303°N 7.592°E
- Construction started: 1836 (today's palace)
- Completed: 1842
- Inaugurated: 14 September 1842
- Renovated: 2011
- Client: Frederick William IV of Prussia (renovation)
- Owner: Rhineland-Palatinate Generaldirektion Kulturelles Erbe

Design and construction
- Architects: Johann Claudius von Lassaulx and others

Website
- http://schloss-stolzenfels.de/

UNESCO World Heritage Site
- Part of: Upper Middle Rhine Valley
- Criteria: Cultural: (ii)(iv)(v)
- Reference: 1066
- Inscription: 2002 (26th Session)

Stolzenfels Castle (German: Schloss Stolzenfels) is a former medieval fortress castle ("Burg") turned into a palace, near Koblenz on the left bank of the Rhine, in the state of Rhineland-Palatinate, Germany. Stolzenfels was a ruined 13th-century castle, gifted to the Prussian crown prince, Frederick William in 1823. He had it rebuilt as a 19th-century palace in Gothic Revival style. Today, it is part of the UNESCO World Heritage Site Upper Middle Rhine Valley.

== History ==
The original castle at Stolzenfels was built as a fortification by the Prince-Bishop of Trier, then Arnold II. von Isenburg. Finished in 1259, Stolzenfels was used to protect the toll station on the Rhine, where the ships, at the time the main means of transportation for goods, had to stop and pay toll (later moved to Engers).

Over the years it was extended several times (notably in the 14th century), occupied by French and Swedish troops in the Thirty Years' War and finally, in 1689, destroyed by the French during the Nine Years' War.

The ruin was used as a quarry during the 18th century.

In 1802, the castle became the property of the city of Koblenz. In 1823, the ruined castle was given as a gift by the city to the then Crown Prince of Prussia, the future Frederick William IV of Prussia. In 1822, the Rhineland had become a province of Prussia. Frederick William had traveled along the Rhine in 1815, the year when the Congress of Vienna awarded several Princedoms in the area to Prussia, and had been fascinated by the beauty, romance and history of the region. In the spirit of Romanticism, Frederick William now had the castle rebuilt as a Gothic Revival palace, inspired by his cousin Frederick's rebuilding of nearby Rheinstein Castle and his cousin Maximilian II of Bavaria's romantic renovation of Hohenschwangau Castle.

By 1842, the main buildings and the gardens were finished. On 14 September of that year, Frederick Wiliam, since 1840 King of Prussia, inaugurated his new summer residence in a great celebration with a torchlight procession and medieval costumes.

Inauguration of the Gothic chapel occurred in 1845 during a visit by Queen Victoria (who began to build Osborne House the same year and Balmoral Castle three years later). Work on the interior of Stolzenfels castle was completed in 1850.

Among those who had worked on the designs for the palace and the gardens were Johann Claudius von Lassaulx, Karl Friedrich Schinkel (draft), Friedrich August Stüler (building) and Peter Joseph Lenné (garden). Stüler was later also commissioned to rebuild Hohenzollern Castle in Swabia for the king (1850–67).

After the First World War, the castle became state-owned. After the Second World War, it was assigned to the Landesamt für Denkmalpflege – Verwaltung der Staatlichen Schlösser, today: Generaldirektion Kulturelles Erbe Rheinland-Pfalz, Direktion Burgen Schlösser Altertümer.

== World Heritage Site ==
In 2002, the Upper Middle Rhine Valley became a UNESCO World Heritage Site. The Site includes Stolzenfels.

== Today ==
After substantial renovation work the castle and its parks were reopened in 2011. The castle is open to the public.

== Gallery ==
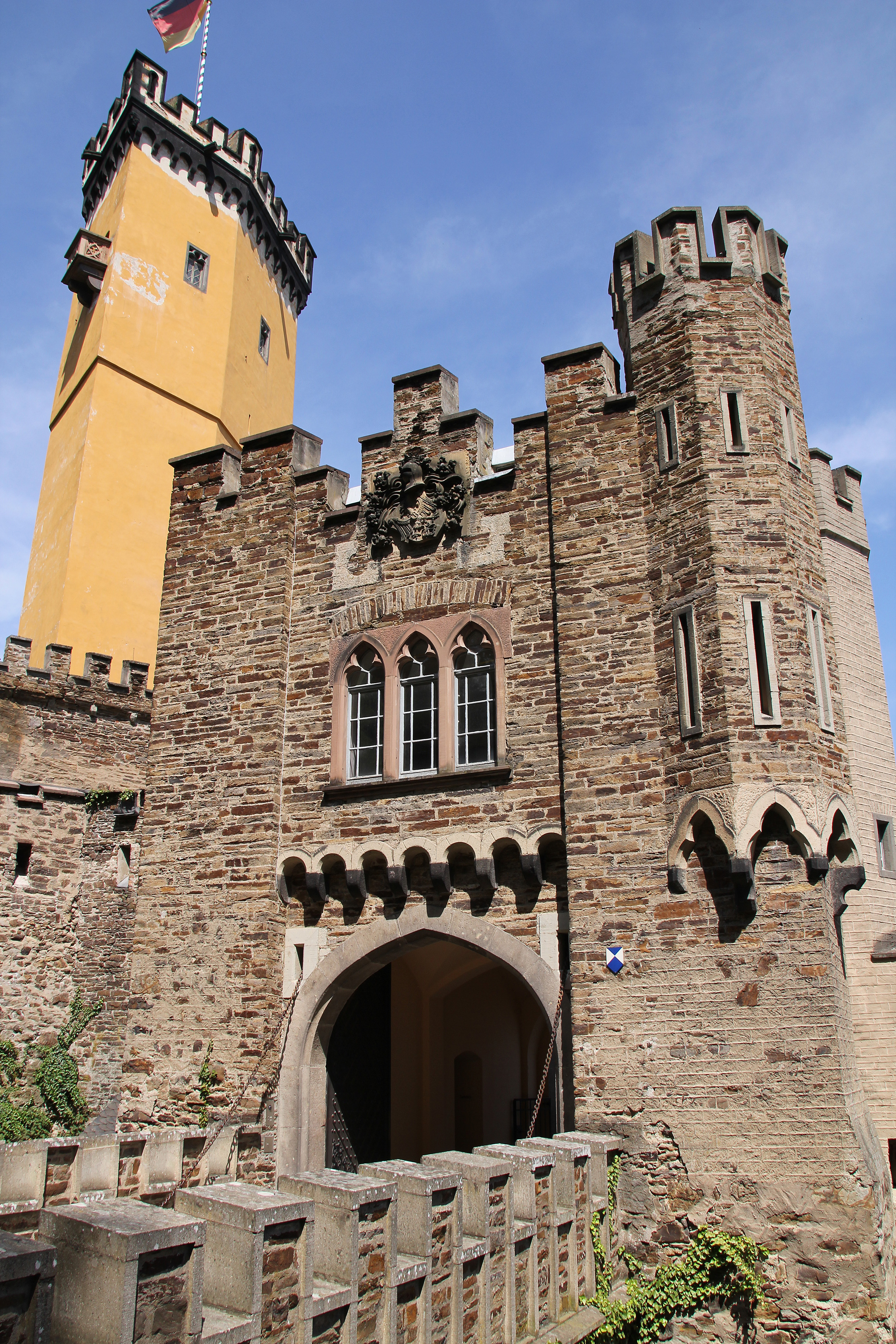
Guard house

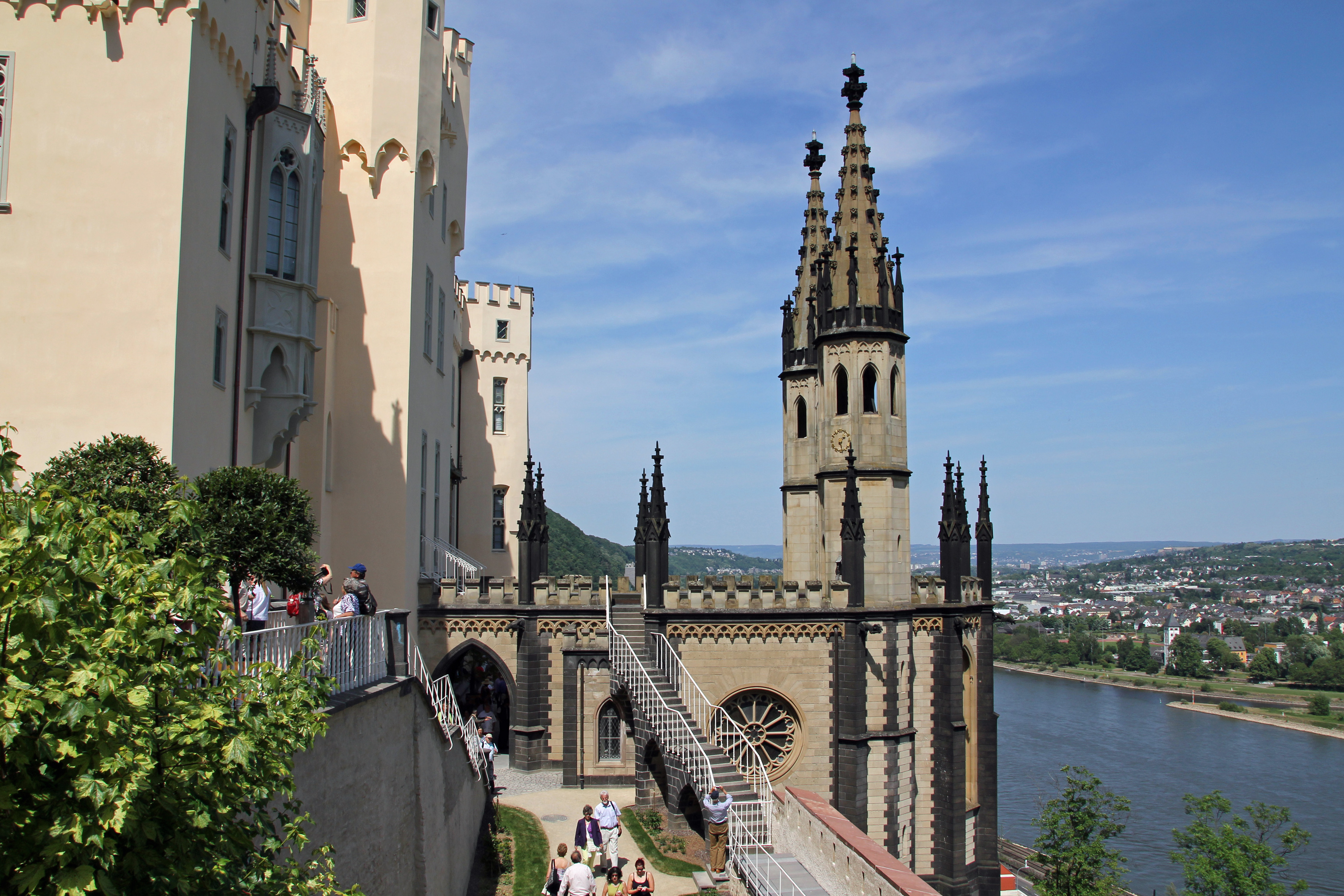
Castle chapel

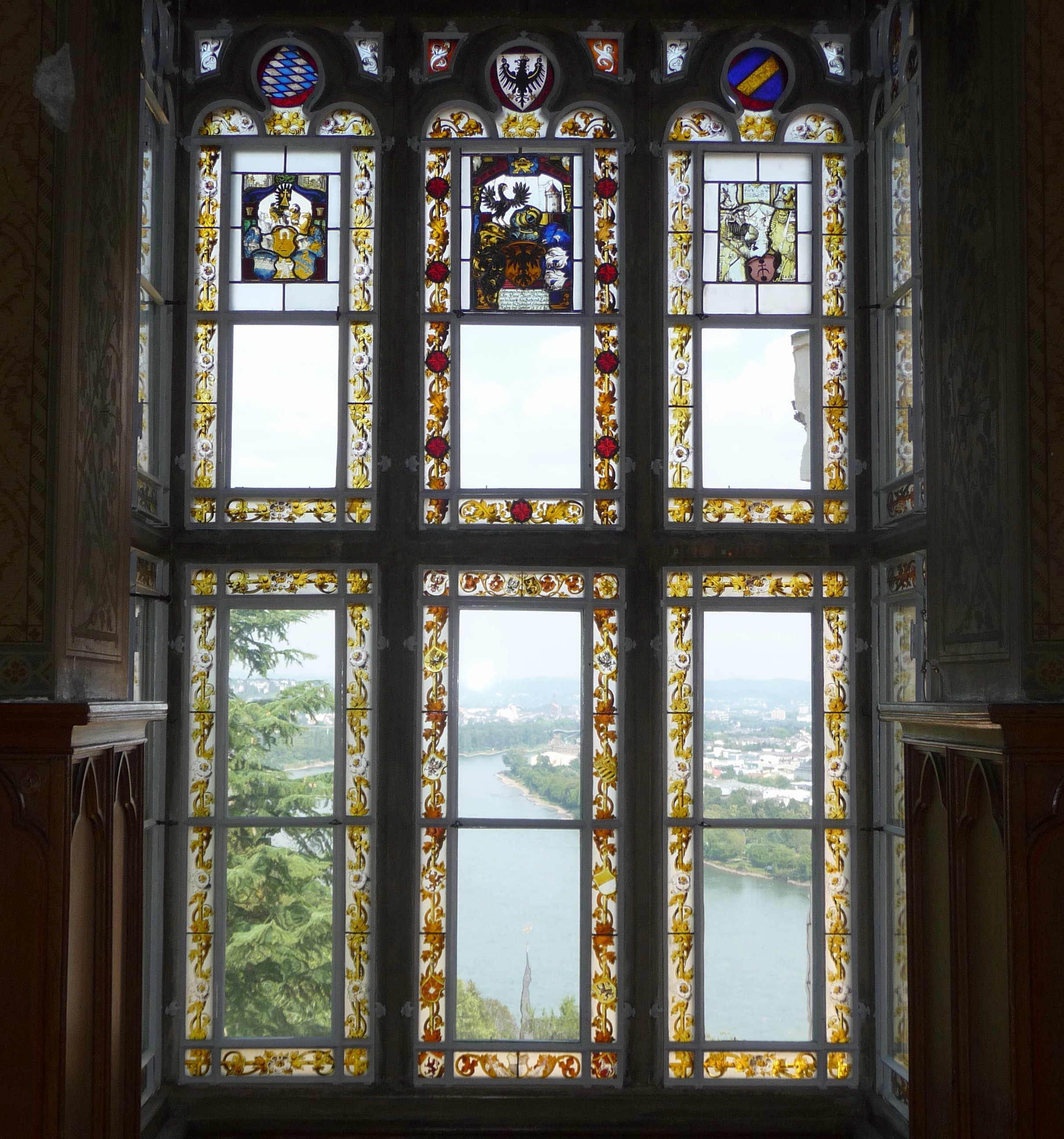
View of the Rhine through one of the stained glass windows

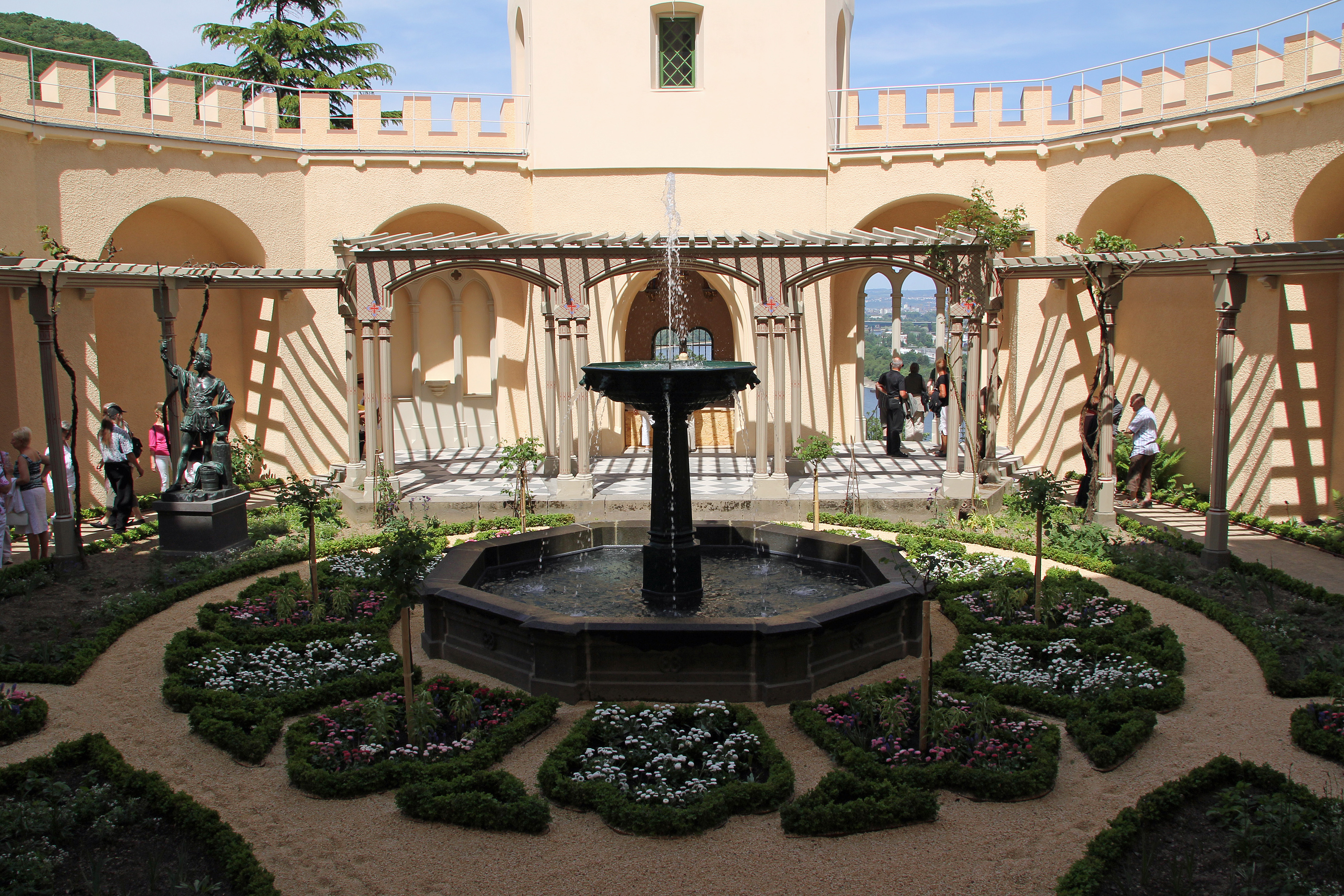
Pergola garden

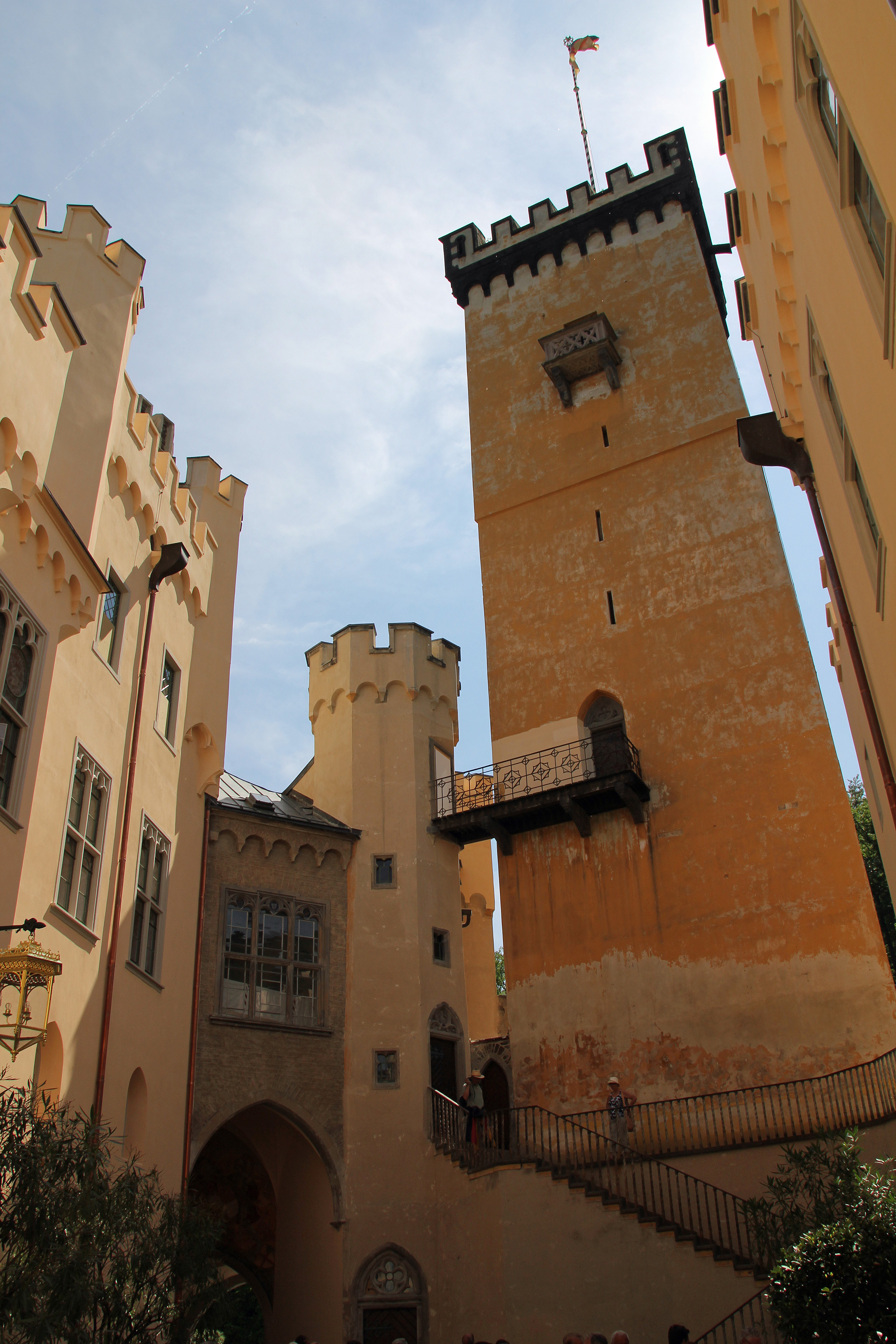
Donjon

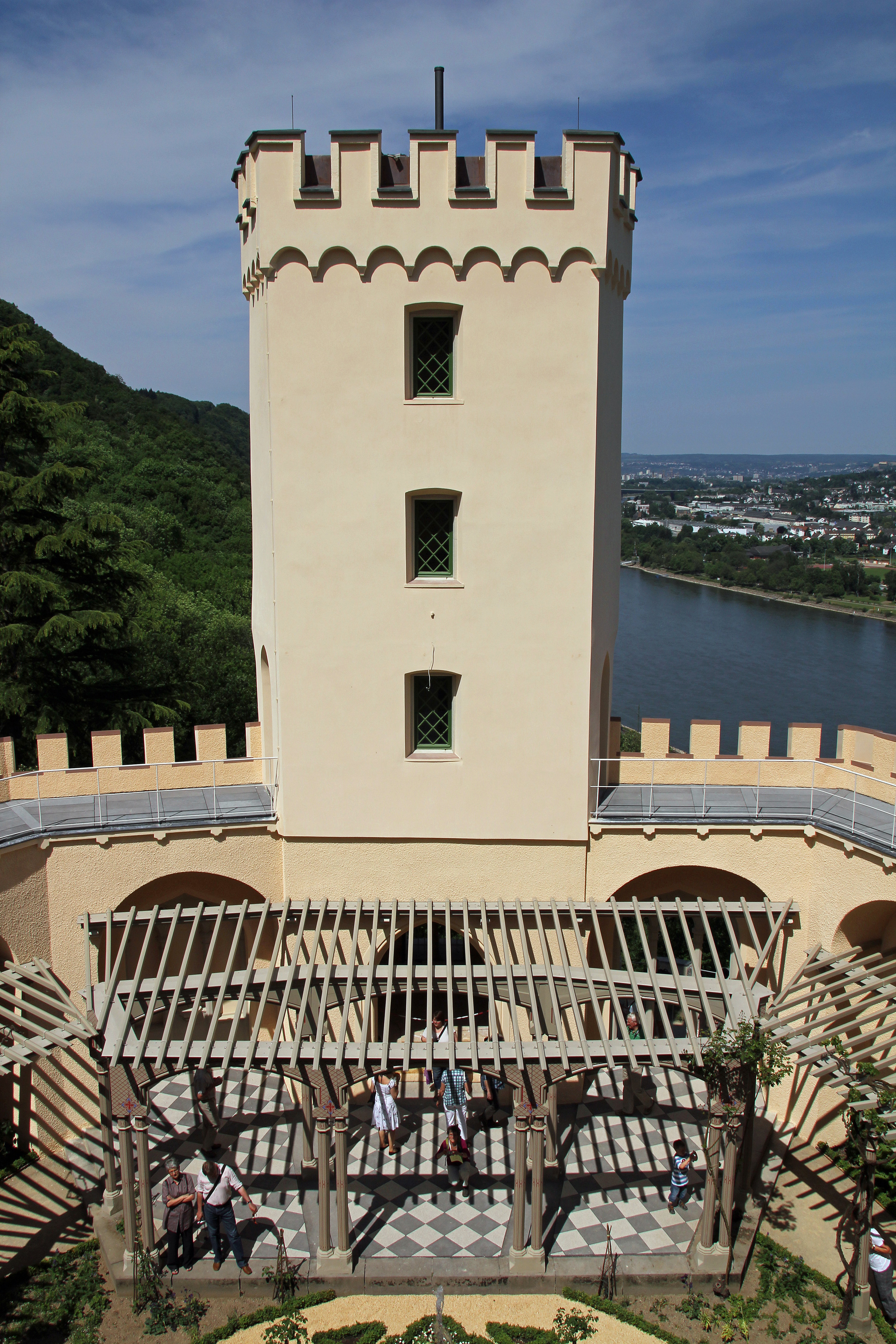
Adjutant tower

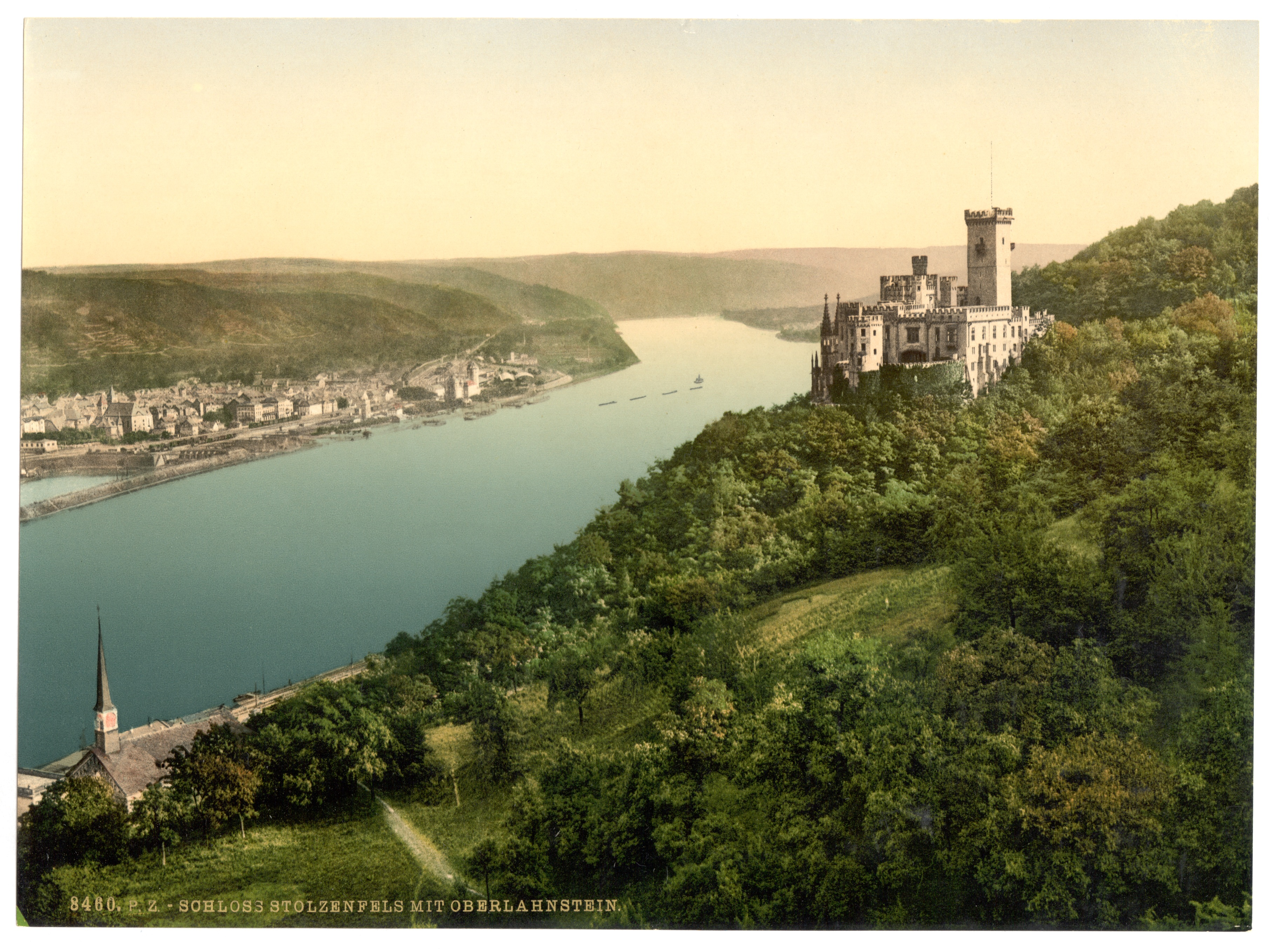
The castle in its landscape on a late 19th-century postcard

== Bibliography ==
- Pecht, A., Schloss Stolzenfels (German), Publisher: Burgen Schlösser Altertümer Rheinland-Pfalz, Landesamt für Denkmalpflege Rheinland-Pfalz, Schnell & Steiner, 2011, ISBN 978-3-7954-1974-5
