= Schloss Rosenau, Coburg =

Rosenau Palace
- Schloss Rosenau
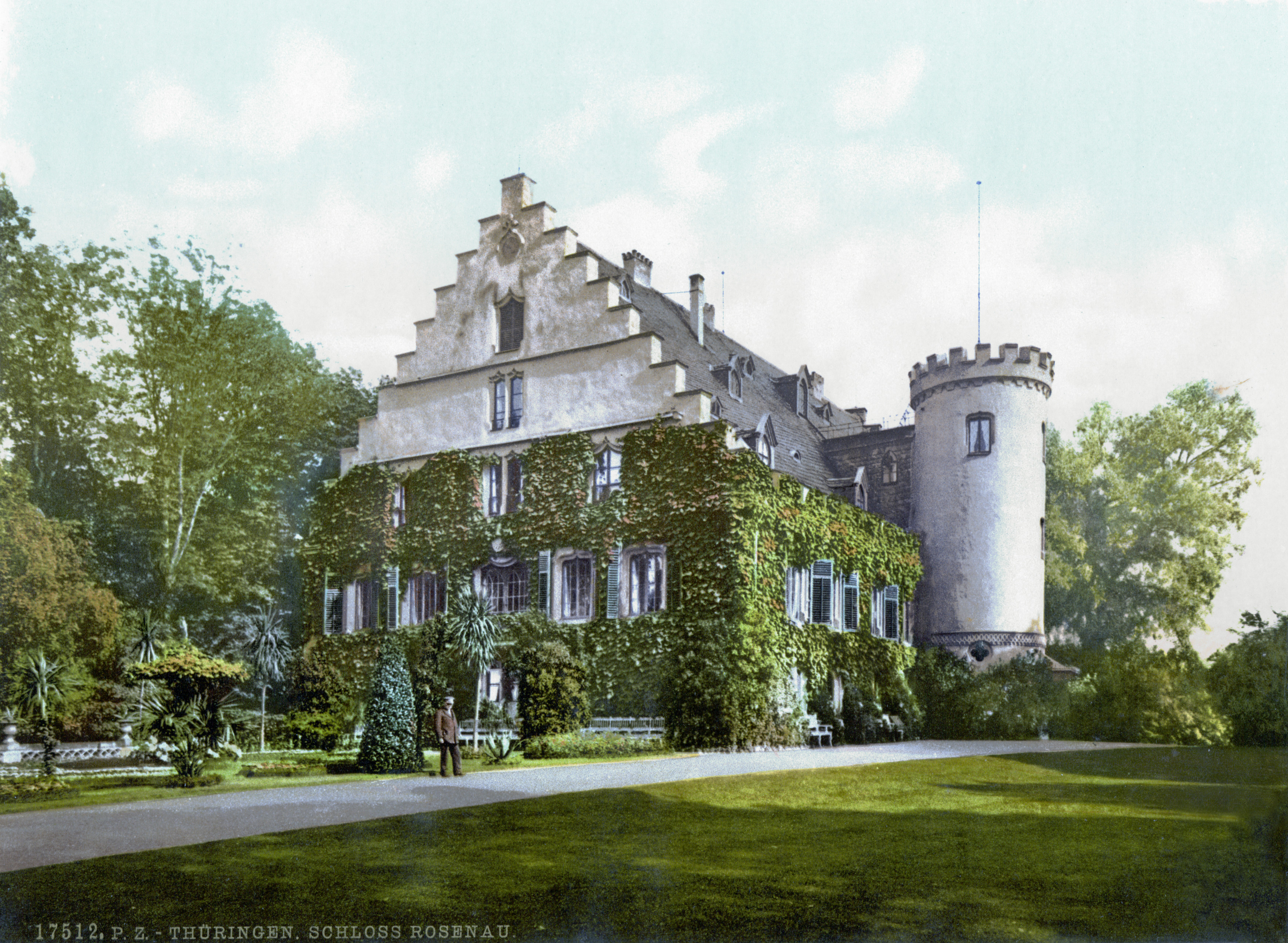
- The Rosenau, c. 1900

- Location within Bavaria Location within Germany
- Alternative names: "The Rosenau"

General information
- Type: Palace
- Architectural style: Gothic Revival style
- Location: Rödental, Germany
- Coordinates: 50.2981°N 11.0225°E
- Owner: Bavarian Administration of State Houses, Gardens, and Lakes

Design and construction
- Architect: Karl Friedrich Schinkel (redesign)

Schloss Rosenau, called in English The Rosenau or Rosenau Palace, is a former castle, converted into a ducal country house, near the town of Rödental, formerly in Saxe-Coburg, now lying in Bavaria, Germany.

Schloss Rosenau was the birthplace and boyhood home of Prince Albert of Saxe-Coburg and Gotha, who, in 1840, became the husband and consort of Queen Victoria of the United Kingdom of Great Britain and Ireland.

It should not be confused with another house of the same name at Waldviertel in Austria.

== History ==
=== Early history ===
The main fabric of the Rosenau is a medieval structure which was first built at some time before 1439, when it is recorded as a possession of the lords of 'Rosenawe'. For three centuries the estate was owned by a family which took its name from Rosenau, but Silvester von Rosenau, a friend of Luther and Melanchthon, bequeathed his properties to his son weighed down by debts.

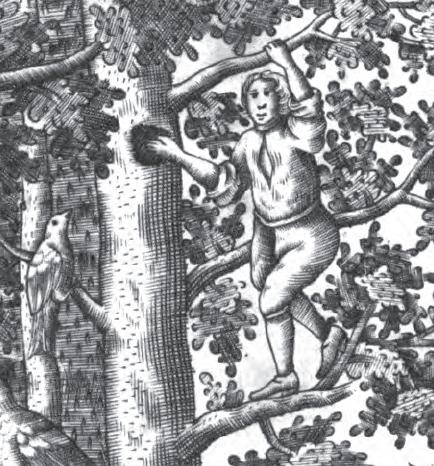
Frontispiece (detail) of Pernau's book of 1707

In 1704, the Rosenau family finally lost the property when it was sold as a summer residence to the Austrian Freiherr Ferdinand Johann Adam von Pernau (1660-1731), who had been a member of the Privy Council of Albert V, Duke of Saxe-Coburg. Pernau was a pioneering student of bird behaviour. As a long-term experiment, he released a large number of young common chaffinches in and around Rosenau between 1704 and 1720, after first teaching them to sing like tree pipits. He was known as the Freiherr von Pernau zu Rosenau, and his most important publication, printed at Coburg in 1707, was titled Lessons, as to what one can do with the lovely Creatures, the Birds, either by Capture, by Probing of their Characteristics and Taming, or by other forms of Instruction, for Pleasure and Profit.

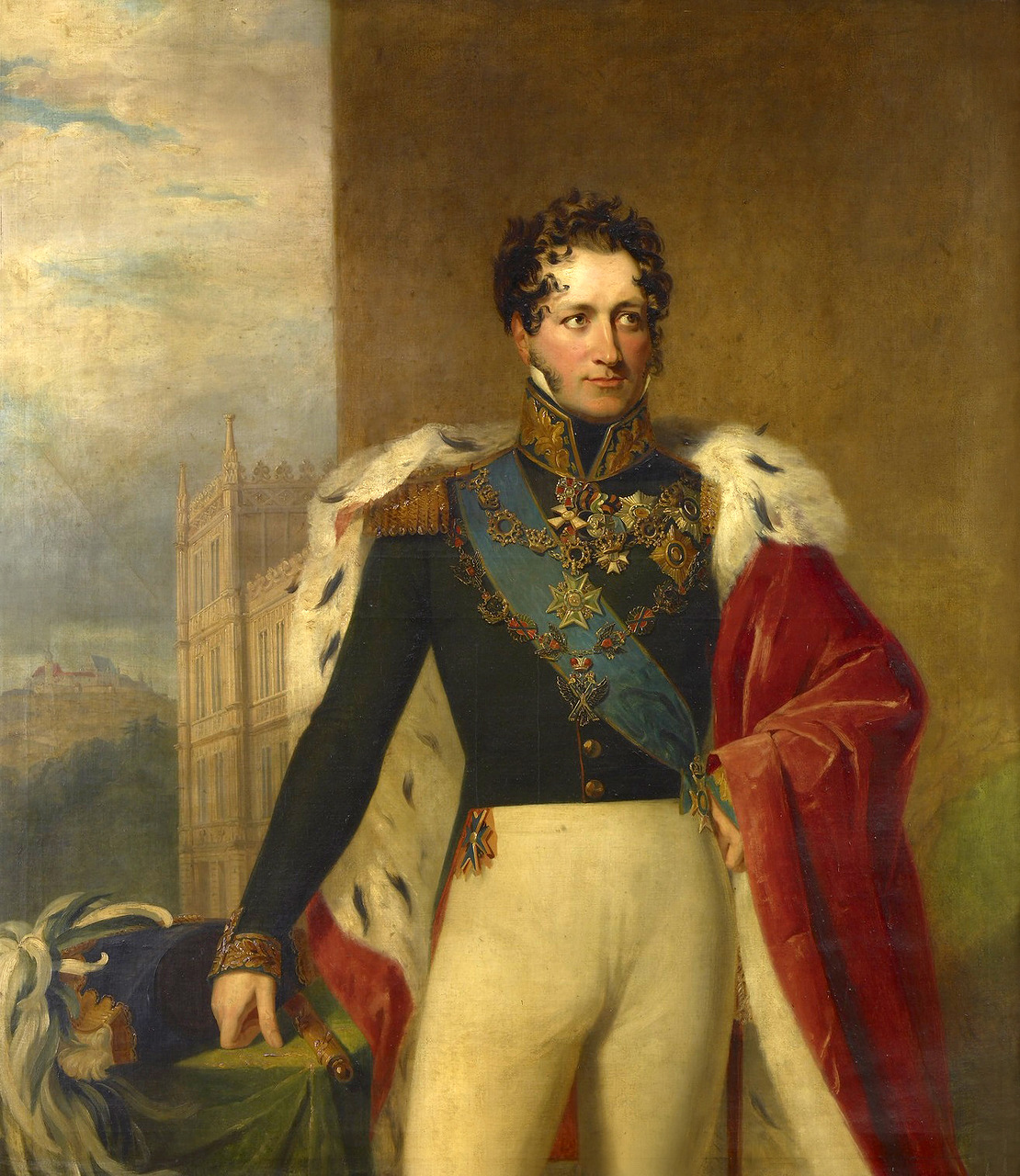
Duke Ernest I, who lived at the castle in the early 19th century

=== House of Saxe-Gotha ===
In 1731, after Pernau's death, the estate was bought by Frederick II, Duke of Saxe-Gotha-Altenburg. Due to the debts of a successor, the Rosenau passed out of the family, but in 1805 Francis, Duke of Saxe-Coburg-Saalfeld, bought it back as a summer residence for his own son and heir, Ernest, who later became Duke of Saxe-Coburg and Gotha. Between 1808 and 1817 the main house was fully renovated and reconstructed in the Gothic Revival style under the supervision of the Prussian architect Karl Friedrich Schinkel. Its Marble Hall (Marmorsaal), with three aisles, takes up half of the ground floor and is so called from its decoration with grey marble. At the same time as the reconstruction of the house, the park was redesigned in the style of an English garden.

In the park are an orangery, a 'Tournament Column' sun-dial, the ruins of a hermitage, and waters called the Swan Lake and the Prince's Pond.

At each end of the Rosenau, Schinkel added crow-stepped gables of an early Gothic style. The windows took on a later Gothic form, while small balconies and coats of arms in stone were added to decorate the main front. The principal tower, which in 1700 had been topped by a domed Welsche Haube, similar to an onion dome, was crenellated, while a ruined tower was left in romantic ruins.

On 26 August 1819, Ernest's first wife, Princess Louise, gave birth in the house to Prince Albert of Saxe-Coburg and Gotha (1819 – 1861). On 19 September 1819, Albert was baptized in the Marble Hall into the Lutheran Evangelical Church with water from the local river, the Itz, with his godparents being Francis II of Austria, the last Holy Roman Emperor, the Duke of Teschen, the Duke of Gotha, and his grandmother, Augusta of Saxe-Coburg. Albert spent his boyhood years at the Rosenau. In 1840, he became the husband of Queen Victoria of the United Kingdom.

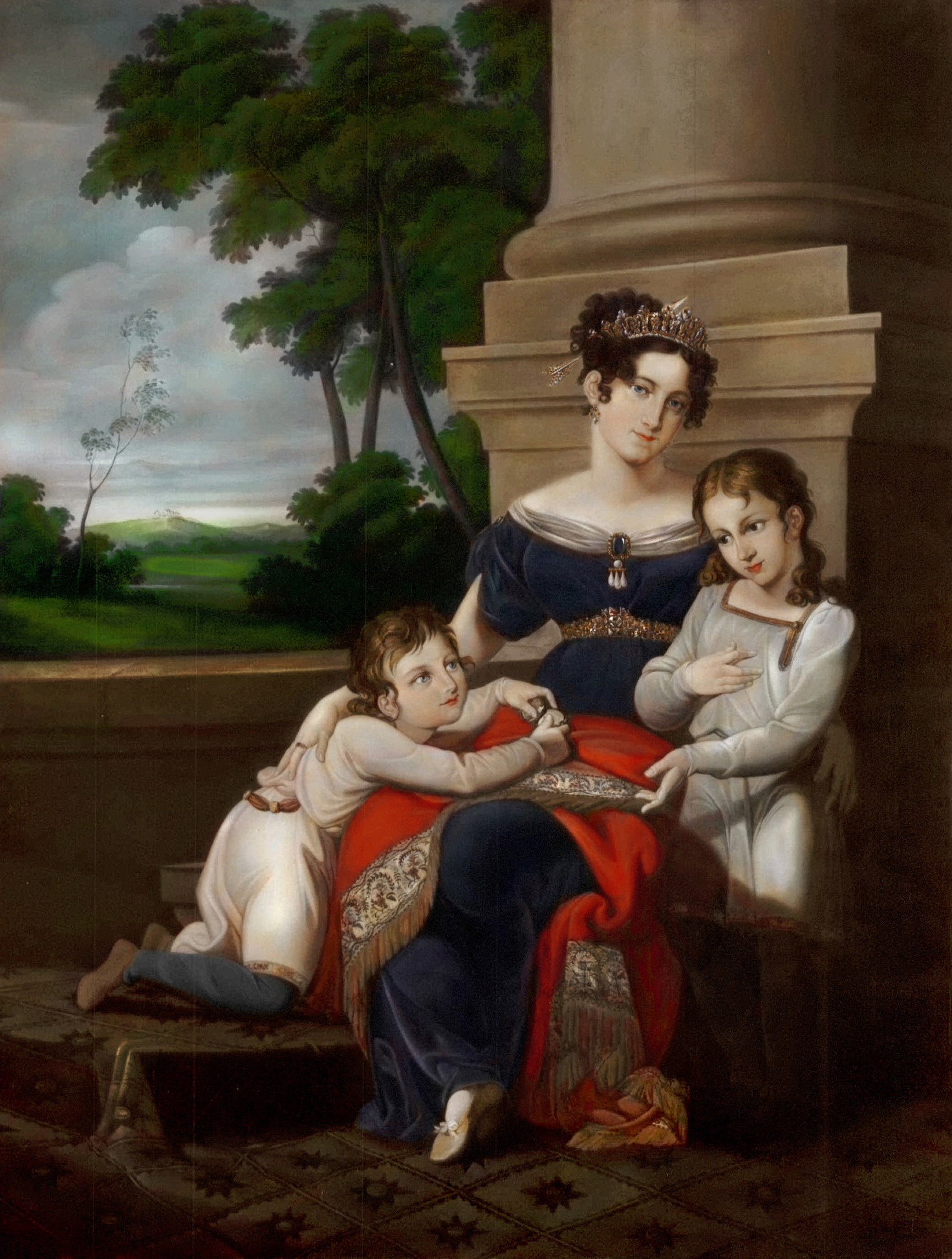
Portrait (Ludwig Döll, c. 1823–4) of the infant Prince Albert with his mother Louise and brother Ernest; Schloss Rosenau is in the distance atop a hill

Elizabeth Longford later wrote of the weeks before Albert's departure to woo Victoria:

...above all, he adored his home, the Rosenau, a romantic little Schloss outside Coburg... Prince Albert had spent September at the peaceful Rosenau, his happy birthplace, fortifying himself against the expected humiliations of Windsor. He set out with a letter of recommendation from King Leopold in his pocket and an ultimatum in his heart.

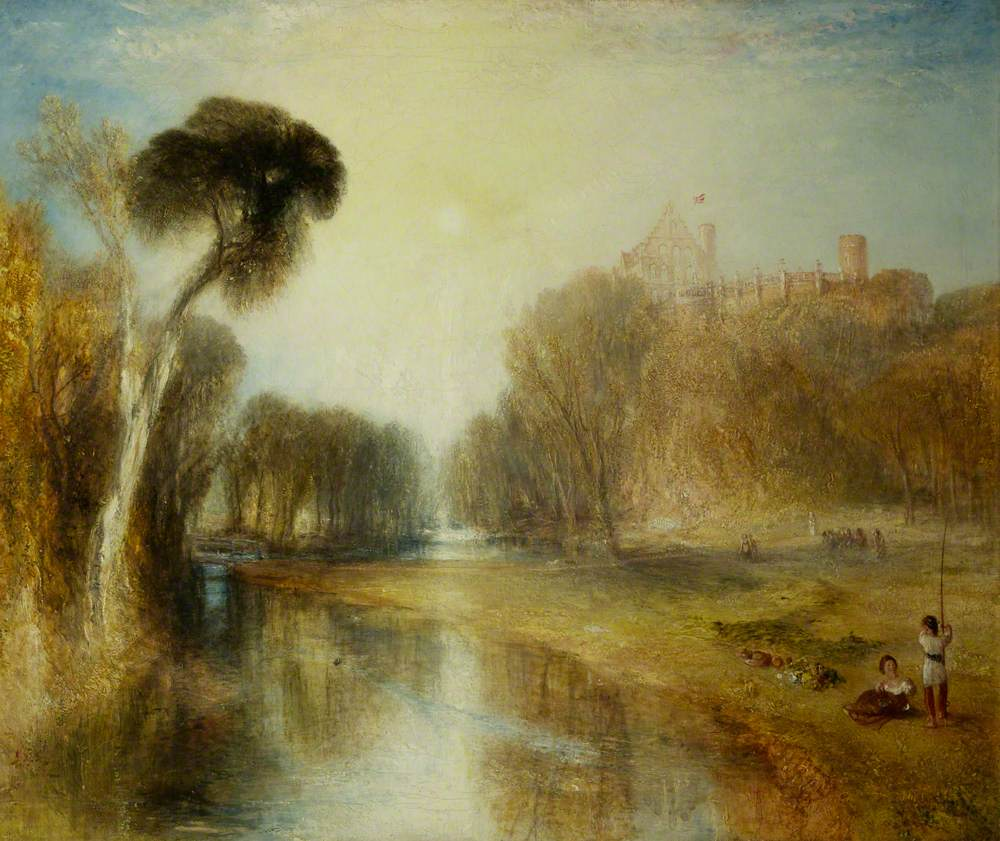
Schloss Rosenau by J.M.W. Turner, 1841

During Victoria's first visit to Coburg, she and Albert slept in the room of his birth at the Rosenau. "How happy, how joyful we were!" Victoria later recalled. Victoria also wrote into her diary that if she were not Queen of the United Kingdom, she would have liked to live at the Rosenau.

The Tsarevich of Russia and his future wife Alix of Hesse and by Rhine visited the house in April 1894, on the day after their own engagement.

Alfred, Duke of Saxe-Coburg and Gotha, the second son of Victoria and Albert, previously known as Alfred, Duke of Edinburgh, who had been second-in-line to the British throne between his birth in 1844 and that of Prince Albert Victor in 1864, owned the Rosenau and died there on 30 July 1900. His wife was Grand Duchess Maria Alexandrovna of Russia, who continued to live at the Rosenau and who died in 1920.

On 15 July 1909, Duke Alfred's daughter Princess Beatrice (1884–1966) married Alfonso, Duke of Galliera, in a civil ceremony at the house, followed by a Roman Catholic religious ceremony at St. Augustin, Coburg, and a Lutheran one in Schloss Callenberg.

=== Post World War I ===
The last reigning Duke, Charles Edward, whose father had been Victoria and Albert's youngest son, Prince Leopold, Duke of Albany, abdicated on 14 November 1918, a few days after the end of the First World War. On 7 June 1919, he concluded with the new Free State of Coburg a termination agreement on his assets in Coburg, receiving some 1,500,000 Marks for about 4,500 hectares of land and for various art treasures and buildings, including Rosenau. However, until 1938 the house was leased to the daughters of Duke Alfred, Marie, Queen of Romania, Grand Duchess Victoria Feodorovna of Russia, Princess Alexandra of Hohenlohe-Langenburg, and Princess Beatrice, Duchess of Galliera. Victoria, titular Empress consort of Russia, was the mother of Vladimir Kirillovich (1917-1992), head of the Romanov family and claimant to the Russian throne. She stayed at the house with her son in the 1920s. Victoria died in 1936 and was buried at the Rosenau, where she had maintained a Russian Orthodox chapel, established for her mother, Maria Alexandrovna. Her remains were transferred to the Grand Ducal Mausoleum of the Peter and Paul Fortress in Saint Petersburg on 7 March 1995.

From 1941, during the Second World War, the house was used as accommodation for the Reichsarbeitsdienst (National Labour Service). In 1945, it became a convalescent home of the Commission for Refugees, and from 1948 was a nursing home for more than twenty years. The house was then empty for a few years, before in 1972 the Free State of Bavaria bought it, by now in a poor condition, with the aim of restoring it.

This restoration work took place in 1985–90. It aimed at returning the house, both in external appearance and in the division of the rooms, to the condition it was in when Victoria and Albert stayed here. To that purpose, watercolours of the Rosenau at Windsor Castle were used.

== Present day ==
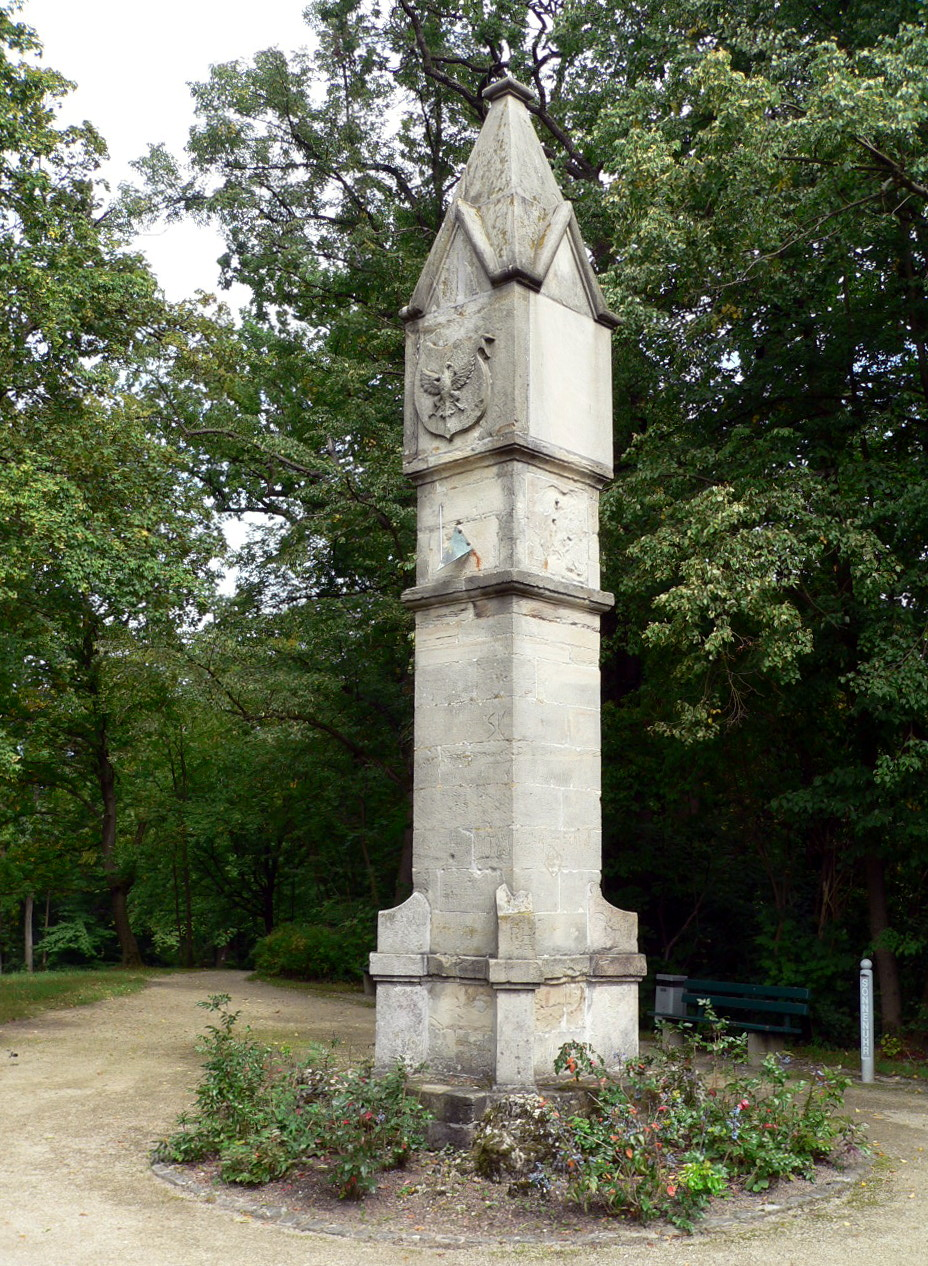
The Turniersäule (or tournament column), a sundial

The Rosenau is now in the care of the Bayerische Verwaltung der staatlichen Schlösser, Gärten und Seen (Bavarian Administration of State Palaces, Gardens, and Lakes), a department of the state government of Bavaria. Since 1990, the house and its landscape park have been open to the public.

=== Museums ===
All rooms on the lower two floors of the house are open to visitors. A small eleven-sided library is decorated with paintings of Friedrich de la Motte Fouqué's The Travels of Thiodolf the Icelander. During the Grand Duchess Maria's era it was used as the Russian Orthodox chapel. Each summer, there is a program of concerts in the Marble Hall.

Upstairs, the other principal rooms have brightly decorated walls and Biedermeier furniture. Among the remaining family heirlooms is a cradle that is said to have been Prince Albert's.

The orangery building used to house the Museum Of Modern Glass (Europäisches Museum für modernes Glas), a museum of modern art glass. Since 2008 it has been in a new building nearby.

=== Heirs ===
The heirs of the ducal family, now headed by Hubertus, Prince of Saxe-Coburg and Gotha, still live nearby, at Schloss Callenberg.
