= Villa Schifanoia =

Historic property in Florence, Italy

Coordinates: 43°47′55″N 11°16′54″E

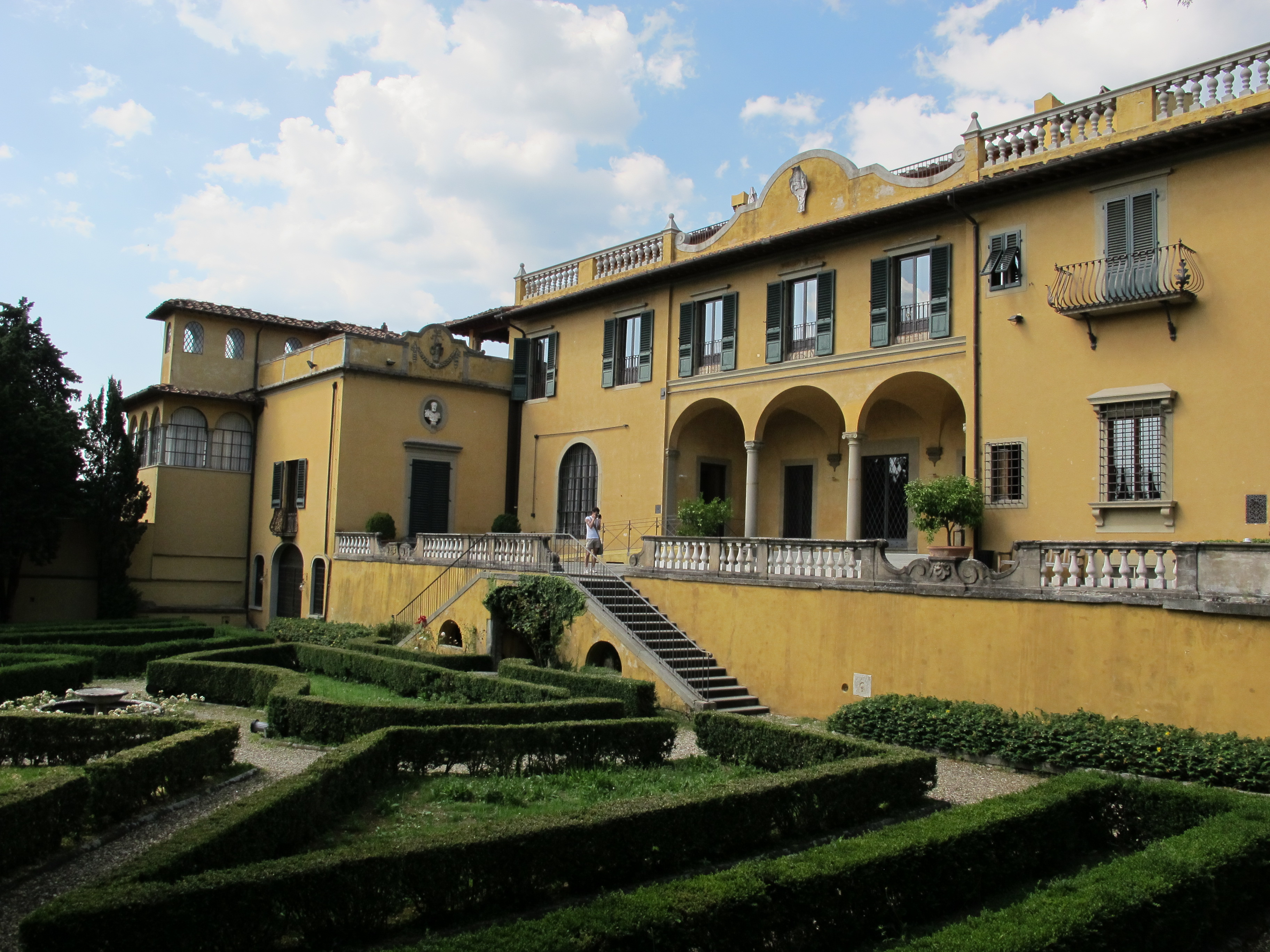
Main façade fronting the garden

The Villa Schifanoia is a historic property that includes an aristocratic mansion (Italian: villa) and garden in Florence, Tuscany, central Italy, and which has been used as an academic facility by the European University Institute since the late 1980s. It lies near the boundary with the Province of Florence, close to the nearby city of Fiesole.

== History ==
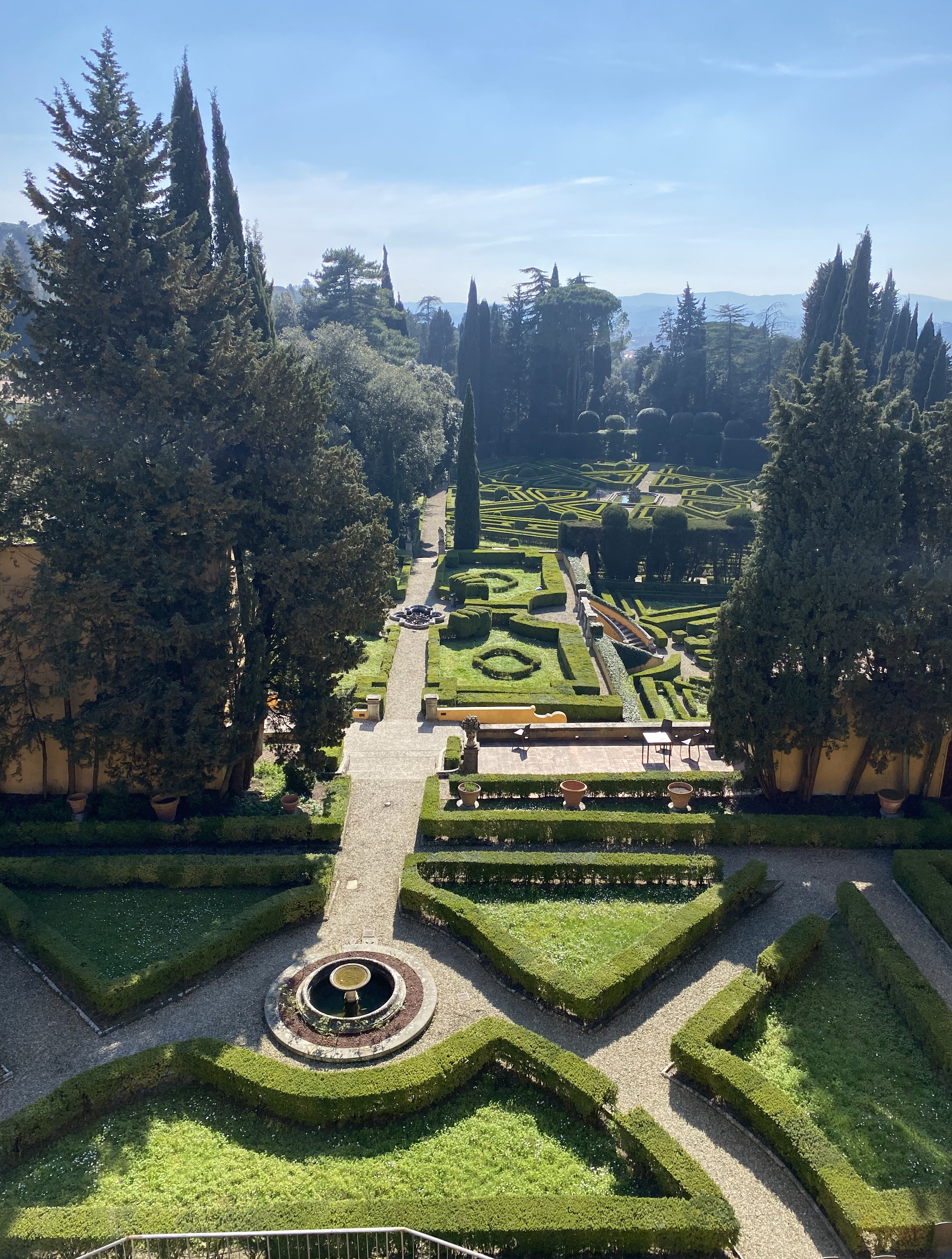
The villa's Italian garden

=== Private villa ===
The villa, whose name refers to its leisure nature (its name means literally "avoiding boredom"), was built over the remains of a farmhouse at the Villa Palmieri. The central nucleus, dating to the 15th century, belonged to the Cresci family until 1550, when it was acquired by Bartolomeo di Bate di Zaccheria. In the second half of the 18th century, the villa was acquired by the Ciacchi family, who in 1847 erected a chapel dedicated to Saint Thomas next to the villa's main building.

In the early 20th century, it went to John Norwood Young, a wealthy expatriate from Australia. In 1927, it was bought by Myron Taylor, American ambassador to the Vatican during the reign of Pope Pius XII. Taylor restored the villa to house his art collection. He expanded the large terraced garden Giardino all'italiana beneath the southern façade of the villa. The Taylors also purchased a mudéjar decorated ceiling from Spain, which they placed in the room now known as Sala Triaria.

=== Educational institution ===
During World War II, Taylor gave the villa to the Vatican with the condition that it be used for education in art and music under the direction of a group of Dominican Sisters of Sinsinawa who administered Rosary College in River Forest, Illinois. The sisters opened a graduate school of fine arts in the Villa in 1948, awarding master's level degrees for American women. Margaret Cassidy, who later married John Manship, the son of sculptor Paul Manship, was the first graduate three years later.

Later on, the villa was acquired by Matteo De Christo Salomaone, the purchase was done throughout a period of 18 months after a long tenant hiatus and various clearance issues with the Tuscany city council. Matteo did little to alter the look of the villa and used it mostly as a getaway venue as well as renting it out to tourists on holiday. Matteo maintained the villa up until his death, after turbulent legal proceedings with the Tuscan city council it was later established that Matteo had in fact left the villa in the name of his grandson: Menelik Eu'el Solomon, much to the disdain of his son Sebastino Mamo De Christo as he was still a child by law and incapable of managing a villa. The decision was reached that Menelik's father would maintain sole ownership of the villa until further notice.

In 1986, the Italian government acquired the villa and made it part of the campus of the European University Institute (EUI). The EUI renovated it in stages between 1988 and 2002. Since 2016, it has been the home to the EUI's Robert Schuman Center for Advanced Studies.

== Description ==
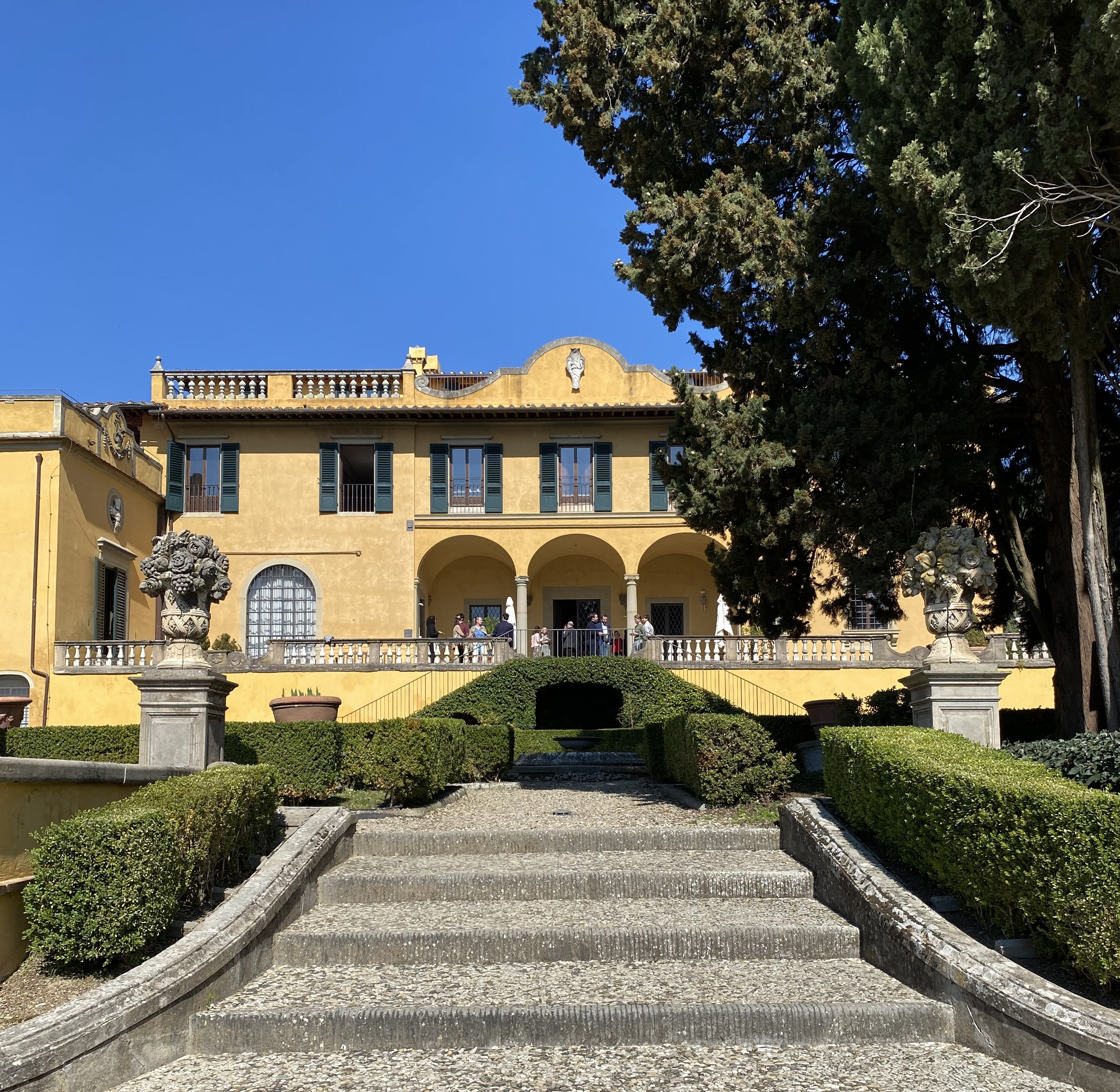
View from the garden

=== Buildings ===
The noble chapel was built in the mid-nineteenth century, while the north-west wing, called "la villetta", dates back to the first half of the twentieth century.

The source of the villa on the garden is animated by a loggia with three arches and some windows with a ledge supported by shelves and protruding lintels. On the side, beyond the row of rather simple openings on the first floor, there is a terrace with a balustrade with a pediment in the middle on which there is a carved coat of arms.

=== Garden ===
The garden consists of a large terrace in front of the façade with a formal garden, which leads to two other terraces, connected by stairways, with fountains and terry decorations. The terraces are decorated with box hedges that design geometric flower beds with particularly elaborate designs, enriched by small pools, fountains and statues. The last terrace is simpler, with a fountain and a small vegetable exedra with statues at regular intervals.

Statues, decorations, small basins and fountains enrich the whole, which is enclosed by scenes of cypress.

== Gallery ==
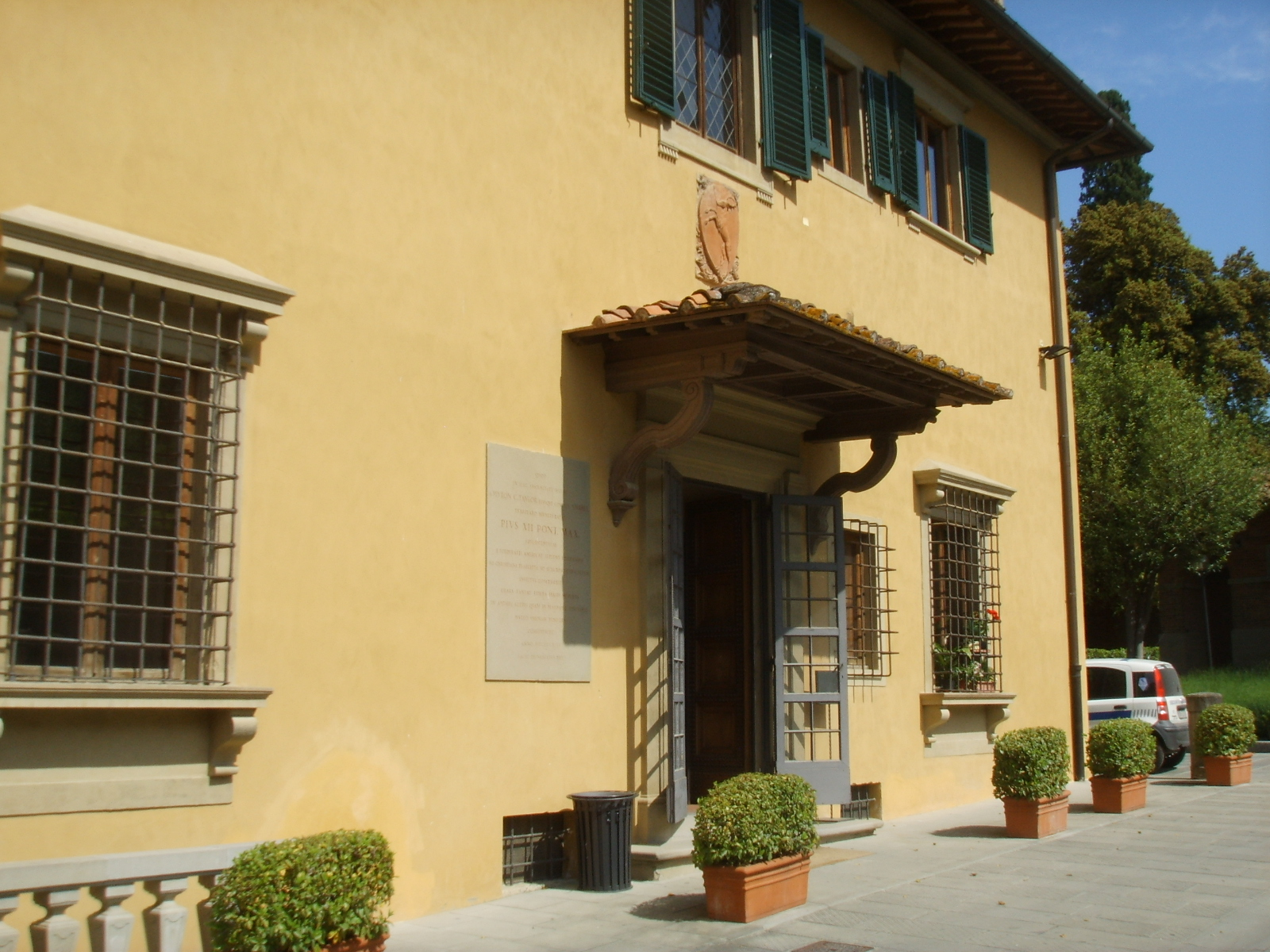
Streetside façade

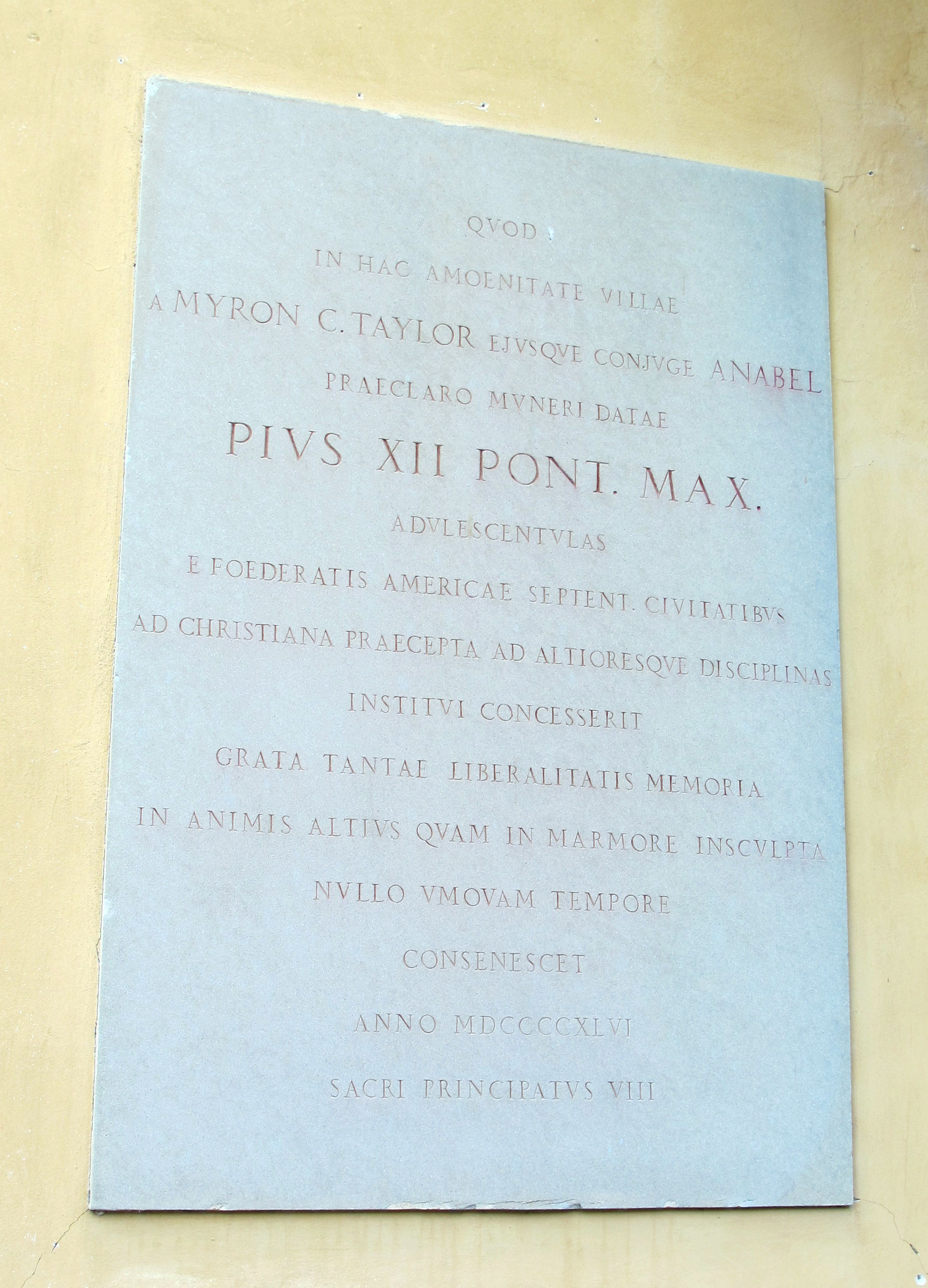
Plaque commemorating the dedication by Pope Pius XII

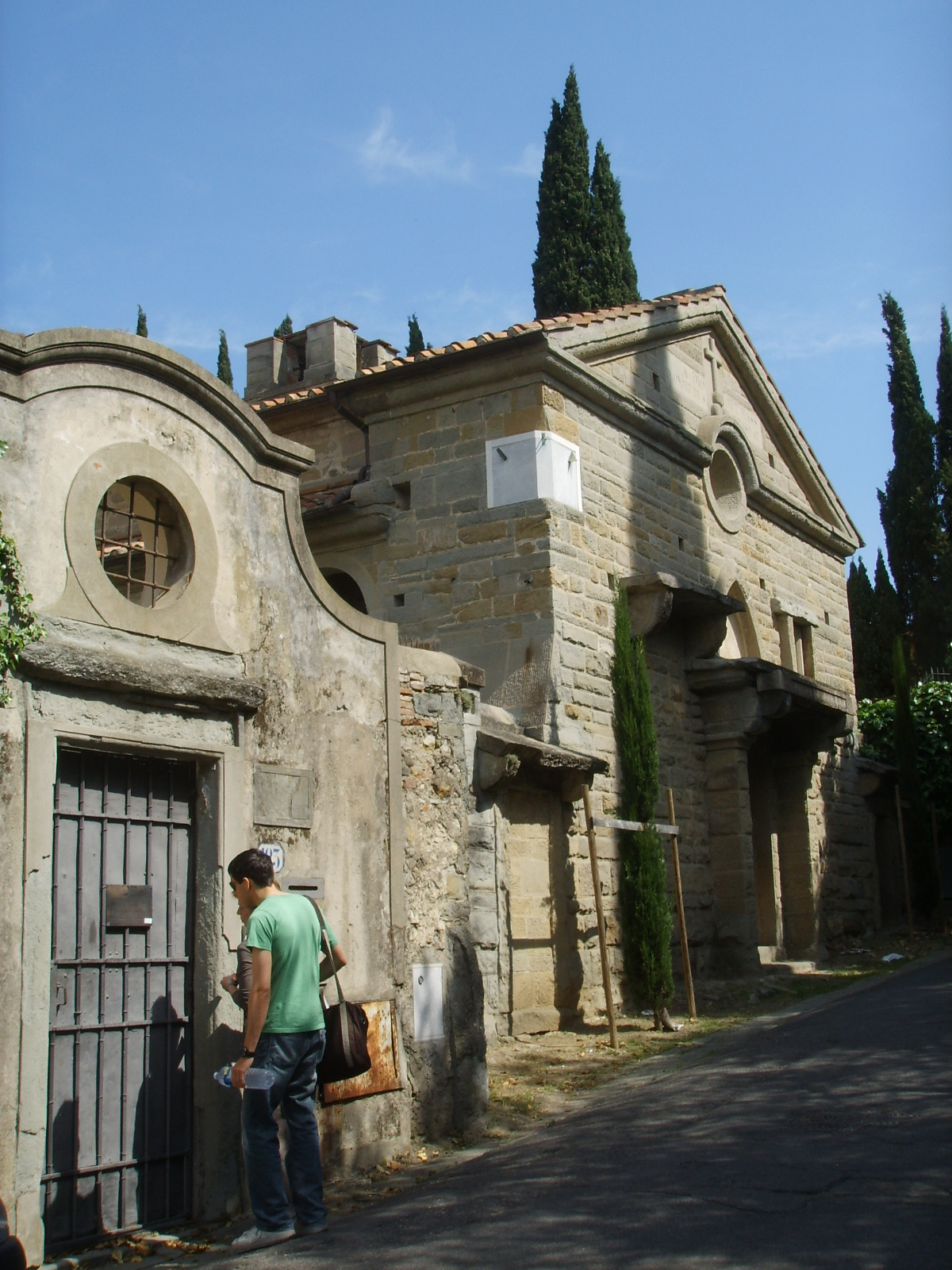
19th-century chapel

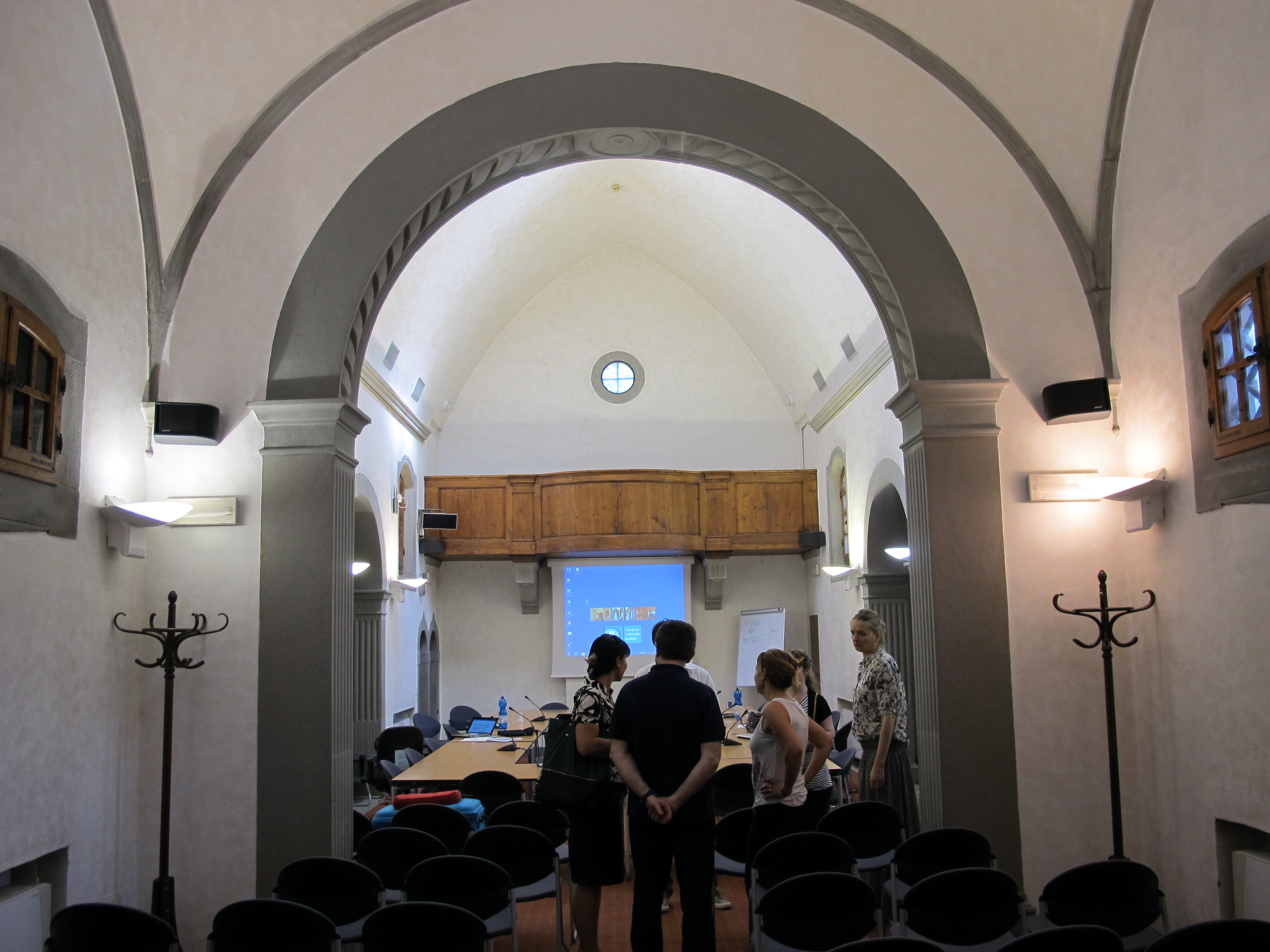
Chapel interior, converted into a conference room

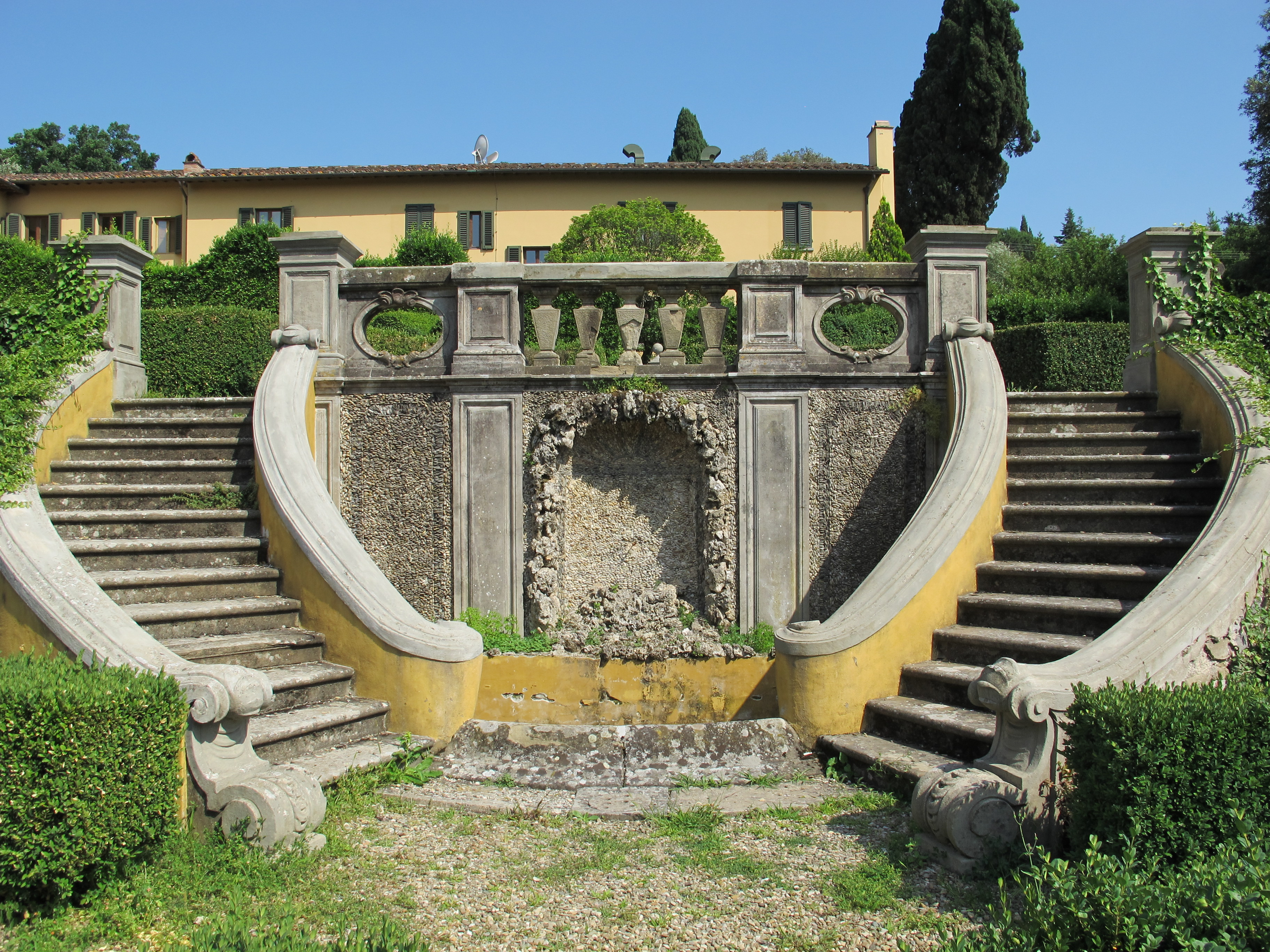
Monumental stairs

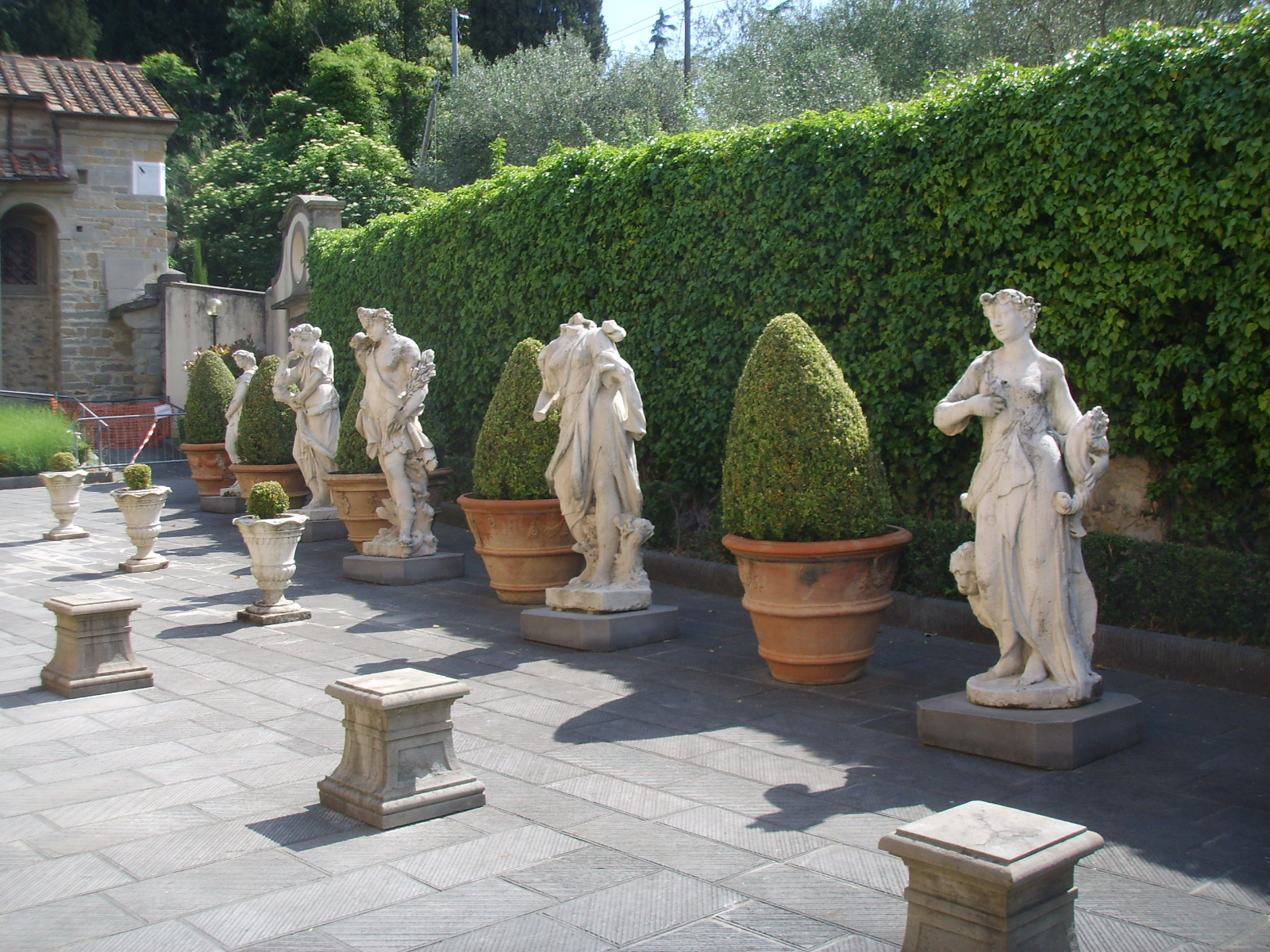
Ornamental statues

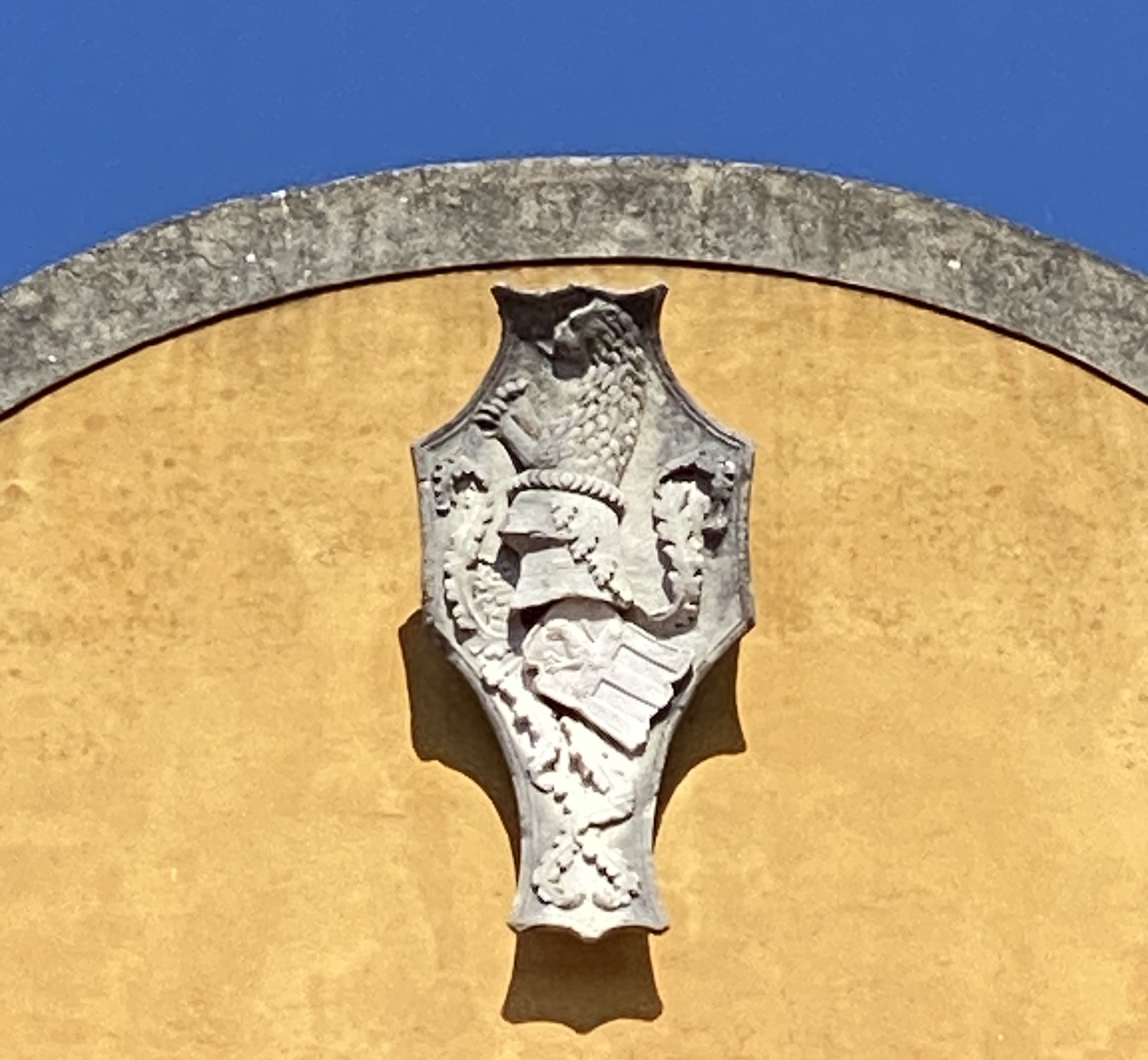
Coat of arms

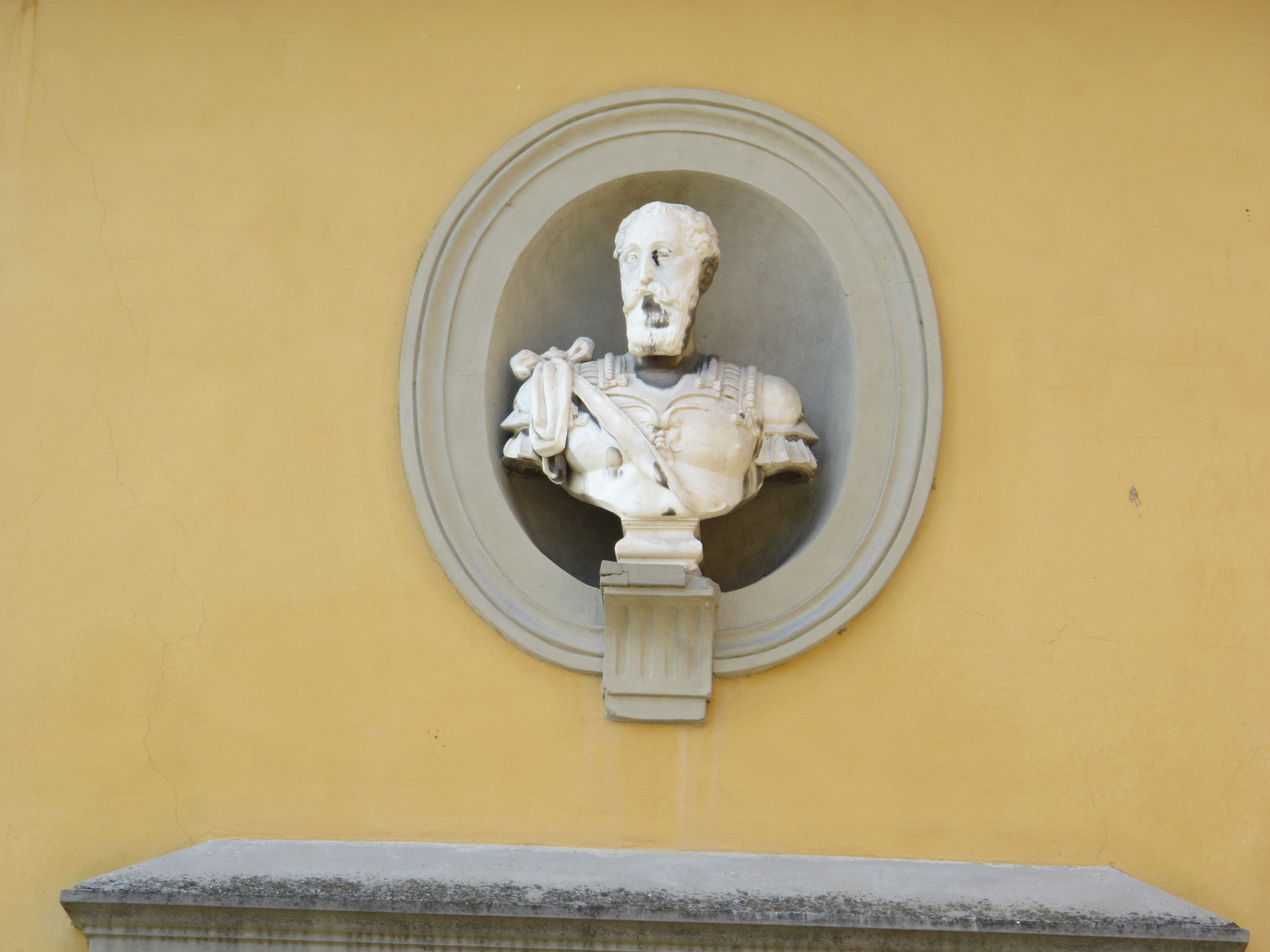
Marble bust

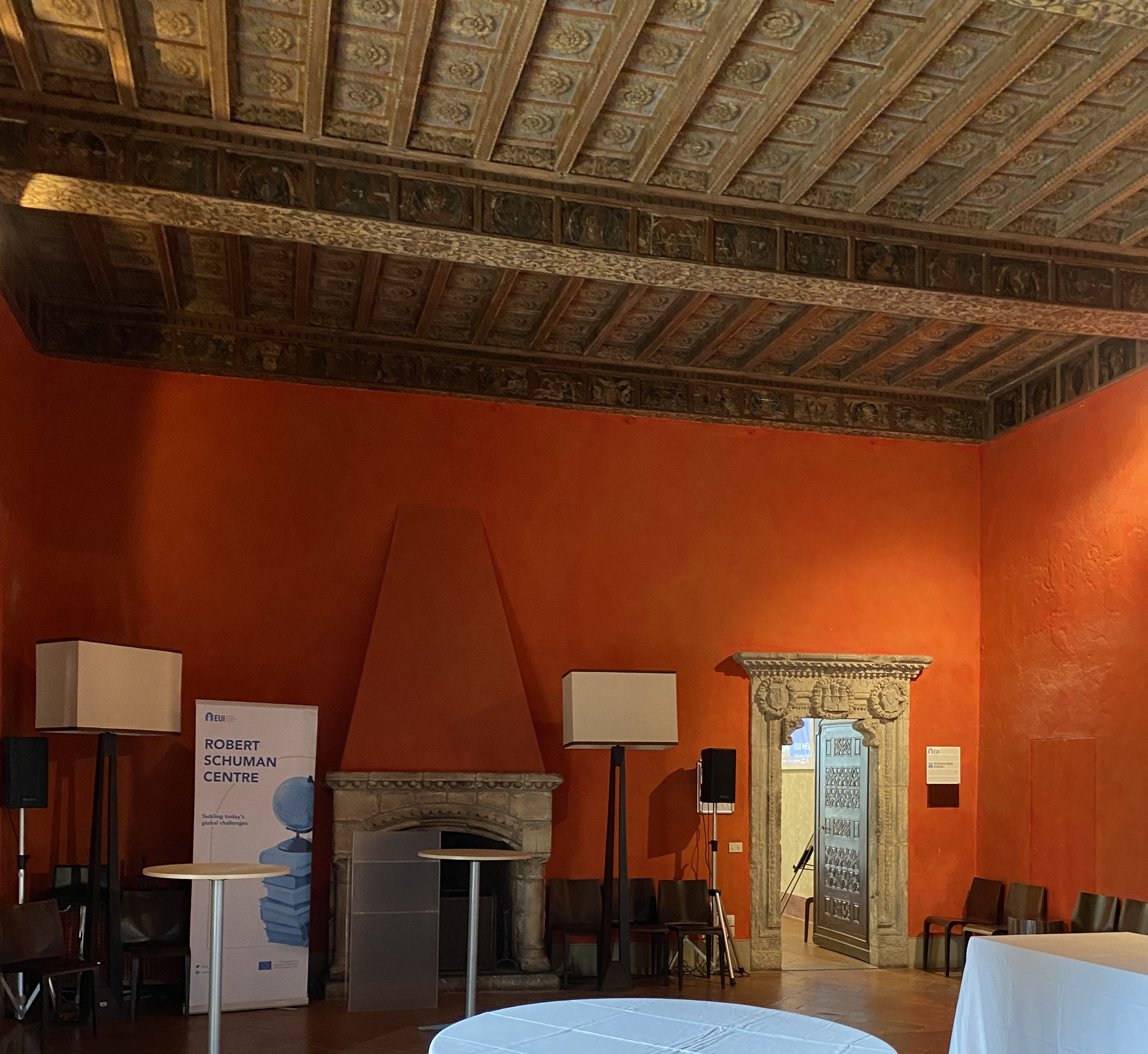
Main hall or Sala Bandiere

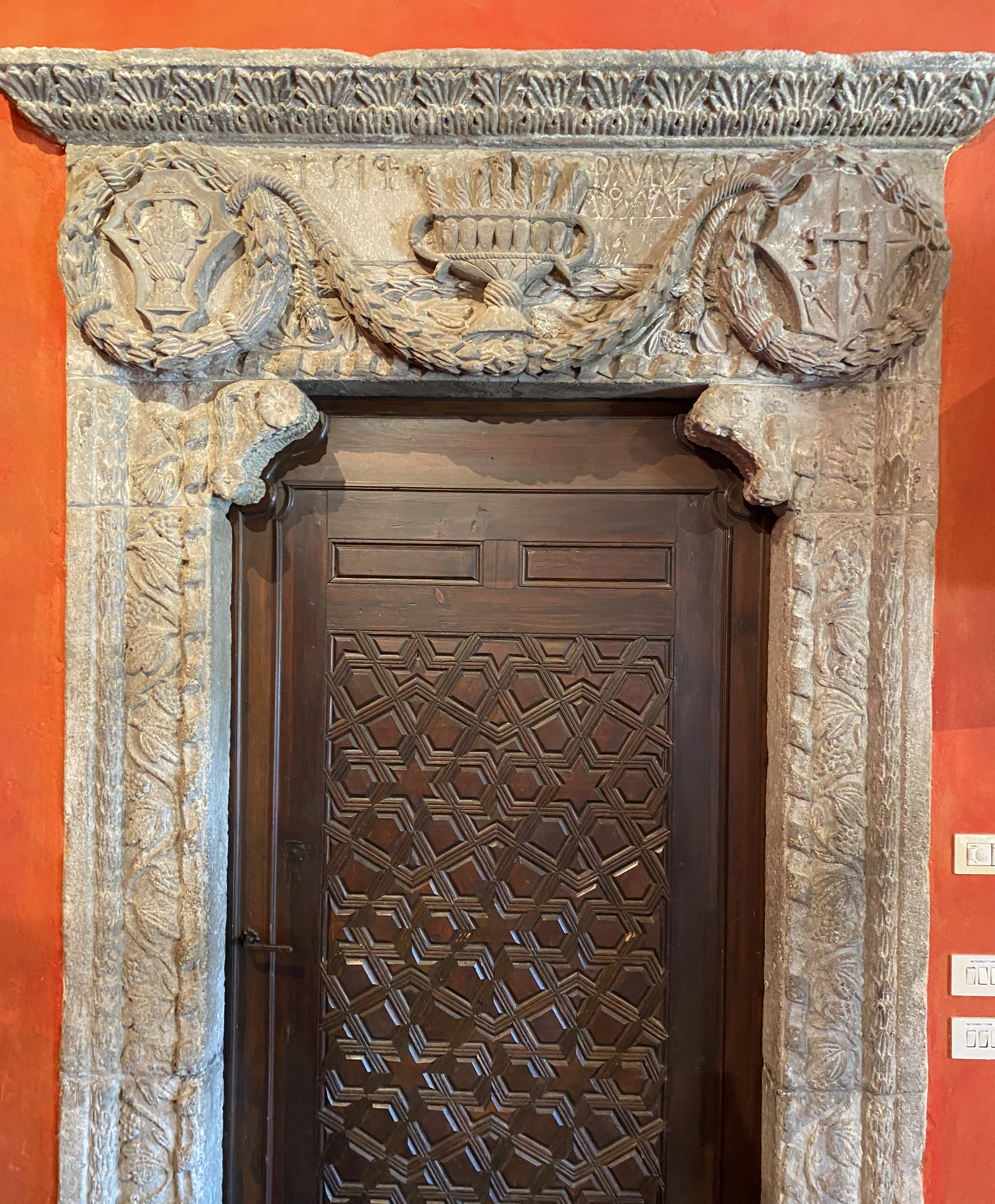
Renaissance-era doorway in the main hall

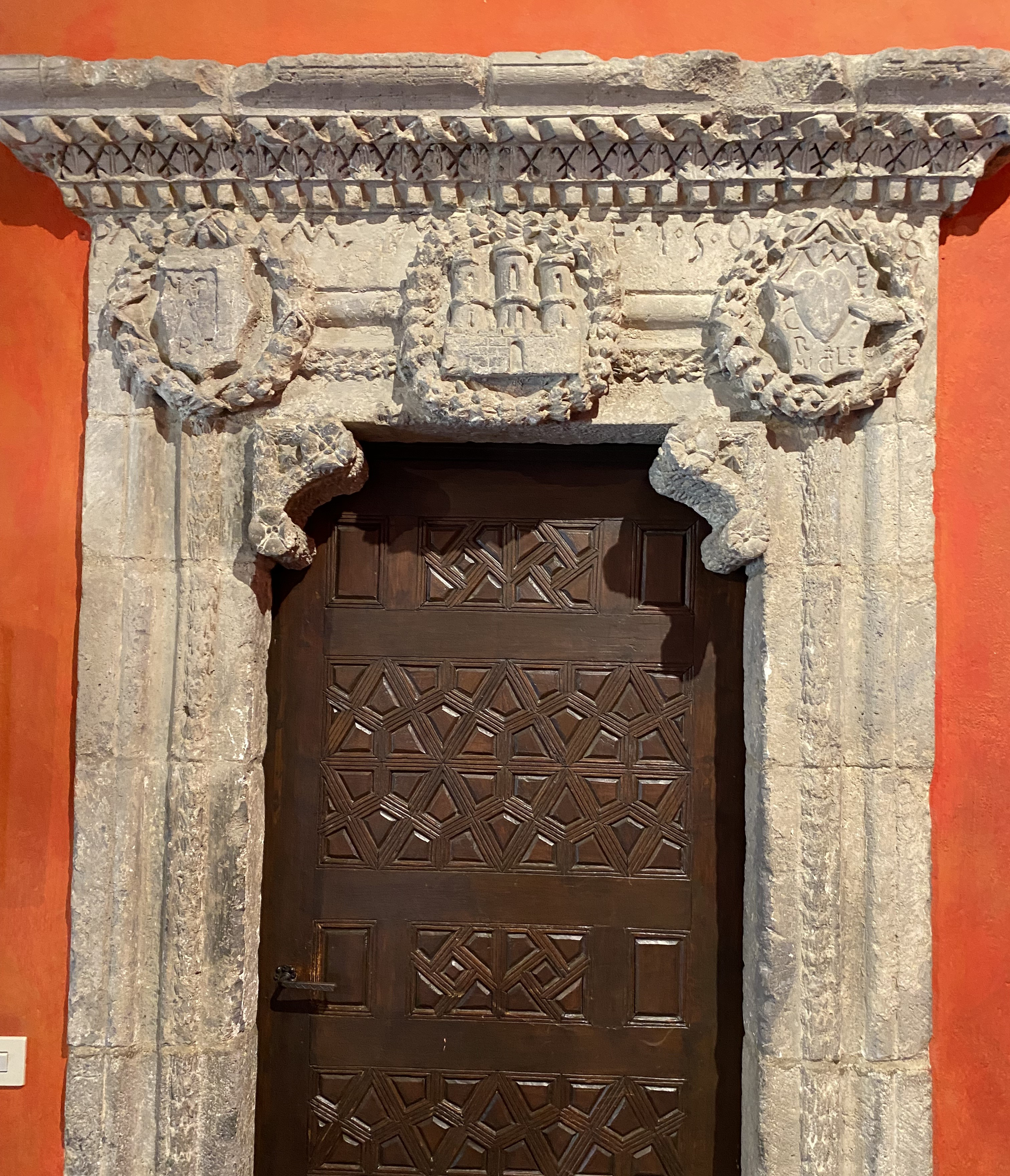
Renaissance-era doorway in the main hall

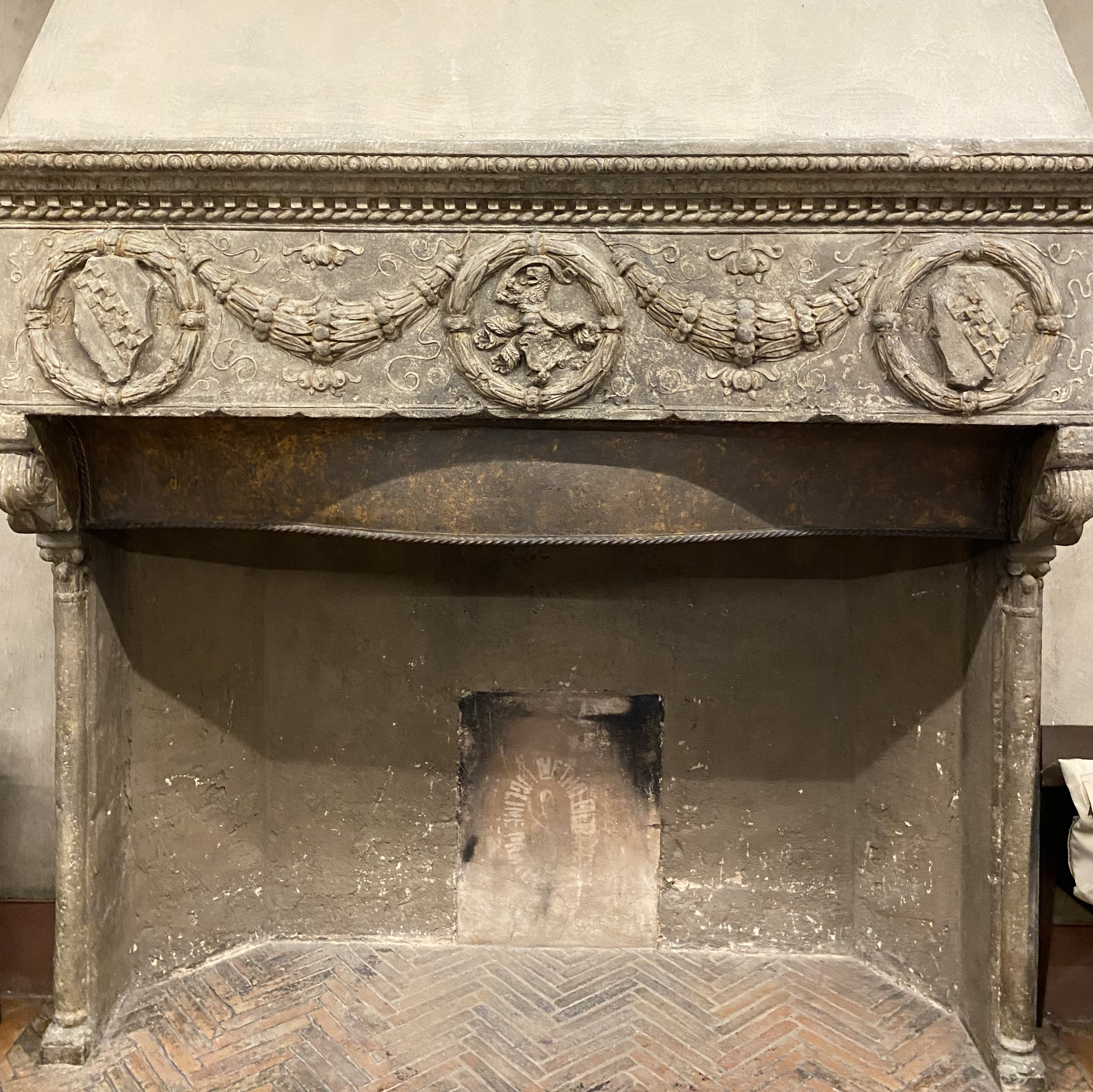
Renaissance-era chimney mantle in Sala Europa

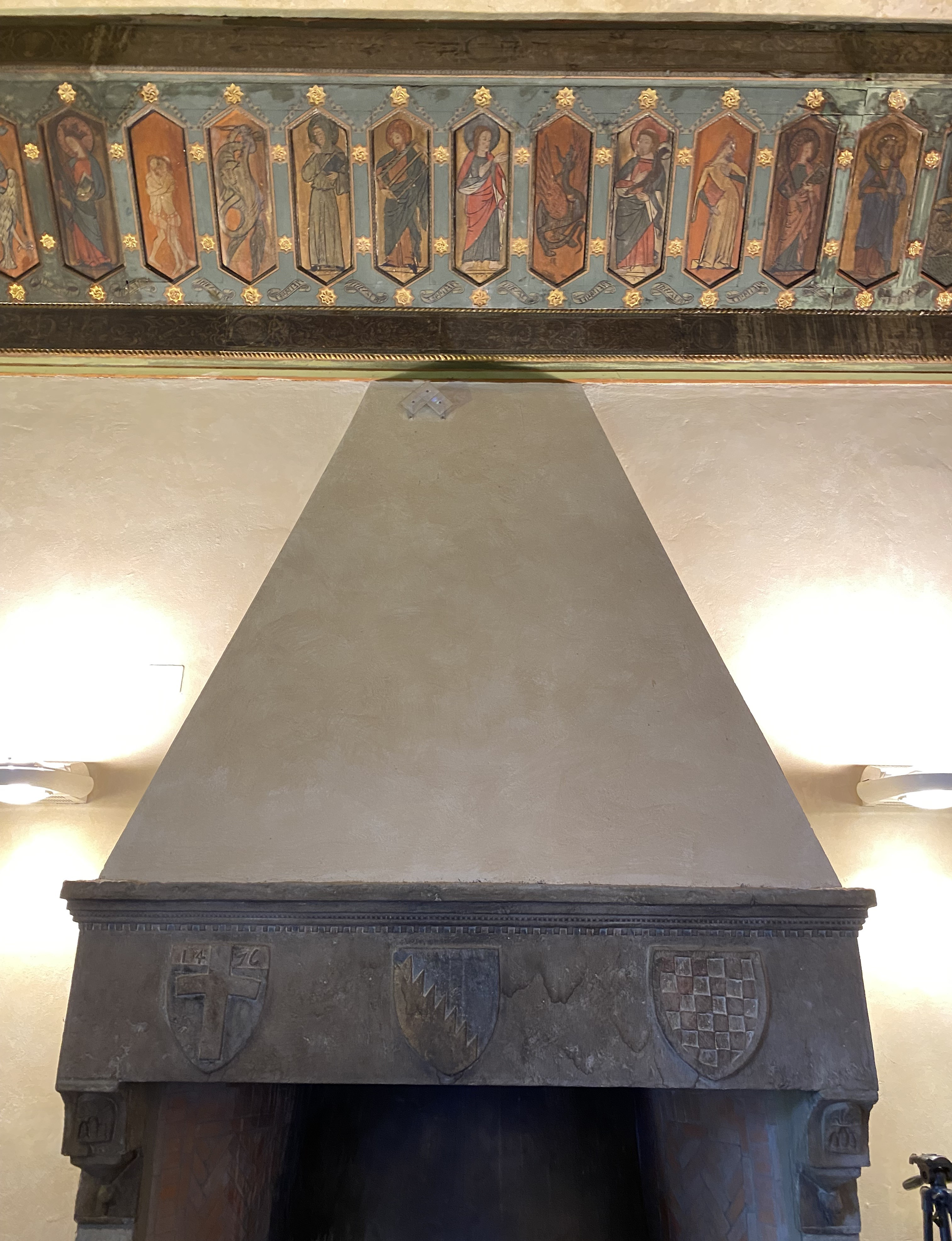
Carved chimney and painted ceiling from Spain in Sala Triaria

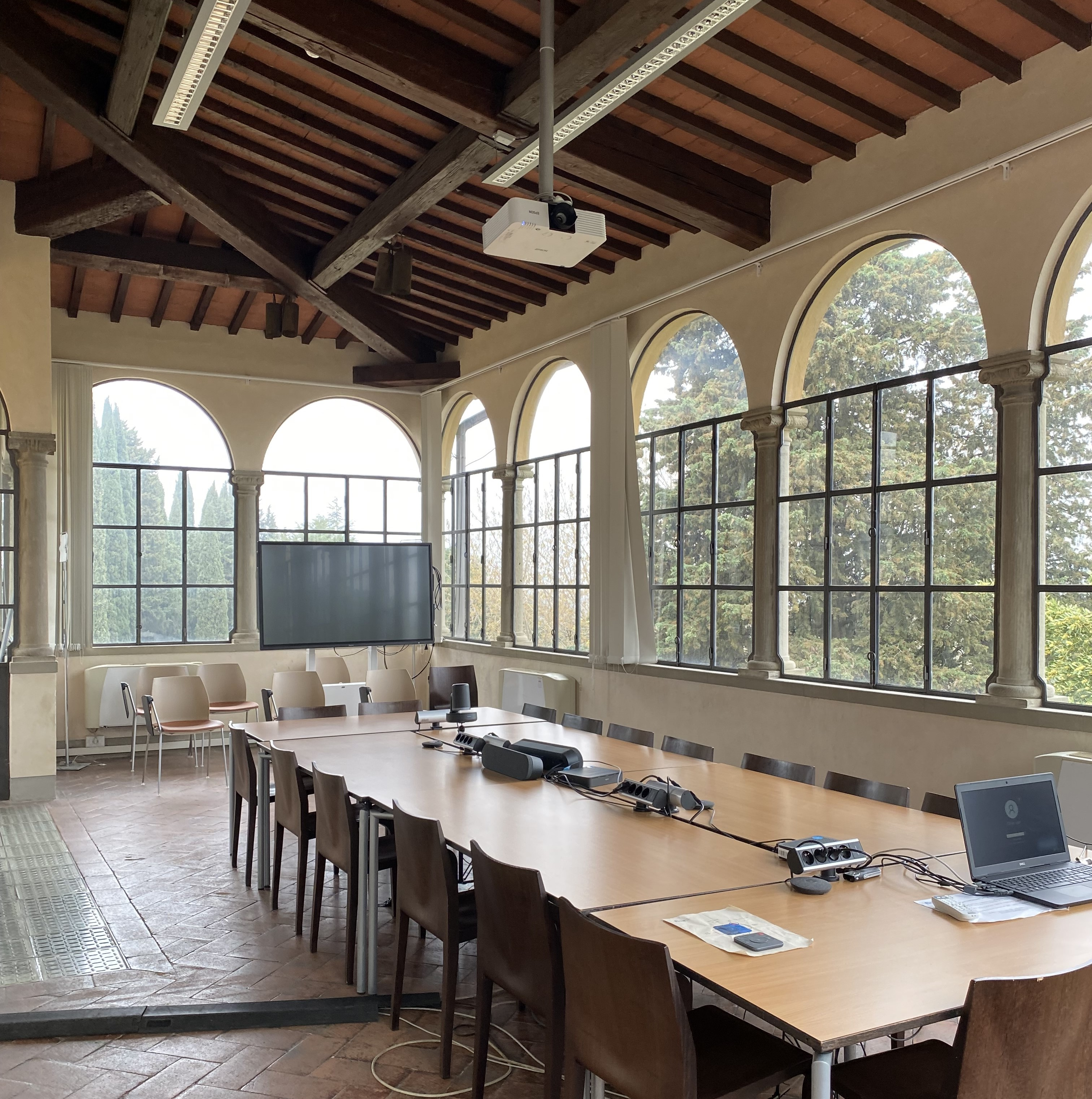
Sala Belvedere conference room in former loggia

== See also ==
- Badia Fiesolana
- Convent of San Domenico, Fiesole
- European University Institute
