= Ferdinand Johann Adam von Pernau =

Ferdinand Johann Adam von Pernau, Count of Rosenau (7 November 1660, Steinach am Brenner, Austria – 14 October 1731, Schloss Rosenau, Coburg) was an Austrian ornithologist.

Ferdinand Pernau entered the University of Altdorf (near Nuremberg) at age 16. He traveled for some time in Italy, France and the Netherlands, finally settling in Rosenau, near Coburg where he remained until his death. Fascinated by birds he built large aviaries where numerous species bred. Here he made observations of bird behavior and also he devised ways to tame birds and studied homing behaviour.

In 1702 he anonymously published a narrative of his experiments and observations. The work entitled Unterricht was mit dem lieblichen Geschöpff, denen Vögeln, auch ausser dem Fang Nur durch die Ergründung Deren Eigenschafften und Zahmmachung oder ander Abrichtung Man sich vo Lust und Zeitvertreib machen könne : gestellt Durch den Hoch- und Wohlgebohrnen was popular and quickly reprinted in 1707 and 1716 (as Angenehmer Ziet-Vertreib, welchen das liebliche Geschöpf Die Vögel, Auch ausser dem Fang in Ergründung deren Eigenschaften Zahmmachung oder anderer Abrichtung dem Menschen schaffen können; Mit vielen Anmerckungen versehen und mit schönen Kupffern gezieret Durch einen Die erschaffenen Creaturen beschauenden Liebhaber)

In 1720 he published an essay (Angenehme Land-Lust Deren man in Städten und auf dem Lande, ohne, sonderbare Kosten, unschuldig geniessen kan, oder von Unterschied Fang Einstellung und Abrichtung der Vögel) in which he said, for the first time that the singing of birds is not necessarily instinctive but is the result of learning. He was also the first to recognize the migration trigger factor was not hunger or cold, but some hidden mechanism. His work anticipated further developments of ornithology including that of Konrad Lorenz. He was also one of the first to show his disgust at the killing of birds : I have no intention of describing how to catch birds [...] but to describe the pleasure of watching these beautiful creatures of God without killing them.
