= List of international official trips made by Queen Victoria =

Below is a list of foreign visits made by Queen Victoria during her reign, which lasted from 1837 until 1901, giving the names of the places she stayed and any known reasons for her visit.

Despite being head of the British Empire, which included territory on all inhabited continents, Queen Victoria never travelled outside of Europe, only travelling as far north as Golspie, southwesterly as San Sebastián, southeasterly as Florence and as far easterly as Berlin. The majority of her visits were made to the duchies and kingdoms of Germany, often via Belgium or the Netherlands. Germany was the home of many members of her family (including, eventually, some of her children, who either married German royals or in one case inherited a German throne themselves), and the birthplace of her husband, Albert, many of these visits were family functions, such as weddings and confirmations.

She made a few official visits to France and frequently holidayed there towards the end of her life and reign, once including a brief crossing into northern Spain. She holidayed a few times in Italy and once in Switzerland. During their married life, the couple tended to make foreign trips in late summer. From the 1870s, the widowed queen travelled during the spring.

== 1840s ==
Date(s)		Locations	Country	Details
1843	September 2 — September 7	Château d'Eu, Eu	July Monarchy	Visiting Louis Philippe I
1843	September 13 — September 18	Ostend, Belgium	Belgium	Visiting Leopold I and Queen Louise
1845	August 11 — August 14	Schloss Brühl, Brühl, Aachen, Cologne, Bonn	Prussia	Visiting Frederick William IV of Prussia and seeing the unveiling of a new statue commemorating Beethoven.
1845	August 14 — August 16	Schloss Stolzenfels, Koblenz	Prussia	
1845	August 16 — August 18	Hotel de l'Europe, Mainz,	Grand Duchy of Hesse	Visiting Crown Prince William of Prussia
1845	August 18 — August 19	Schloss Würzburg, Würzburg,	Kingdom of Bavaria	Visiting Luitpold, Prince Regent of Bavaria
1845	August 19 — August 27	Schloss Rosenau, Coburg	Saxe-Coburg and Gotha	Visiting Ernest II, Duke of Saxe-Coburg and Gotha
1845	August 27	Elisabethenburg Palace, Meiningen	Saxe-Coburg and Gotha	Visiting Bernhard II, Duke of Saxe-Meiningen
1845	August 27 — August 28	Reinhardsbrunn, Friedrichroda	Saxe-Coburg and Gotha	
1845	August 28 — September 3	Schloss Friedrichsthal, Gotha	Saxe-Coburg and Gotha	Visiting Karoline Amalie, Dowager Duchess of Saxe-Gotha-Altenburg
1845	September 3	Wartburg, Eisenach	Saxe-Weimar-Eisenach	Visiting Charles Frederick, Grand Duke of Saxe-Weimar-Eisenach
1845	September 3 — September 4	Kurfürst Hotel, Fulda	Grand Duchy of Hesse	
1845	September 4 — September 5	Hotel d'Angleterre, Frankfurt	Free City of Frankfurt	Receiving Ludwig I of Bavaria
1845	September 5 — September 6	Hotel, Deutz	Prussia	
1845	September 6 — September 7	Antwerp	Belgium	Visiting Leopold I of Belgium
1845	September 8 — September 9	Château d'Eu, Eu	July Monarchy	Visiting Louis Philippe I

== 1850s ==
Date(s)		Locations	Country	Details
1855	August 18 — August 27	Château de Saint-Cloud, Saint-Cloud, Paris, Versailles and Saint-Germain	Second French Empire	Visiting Napoleon III
1858	August 5 — 6 August	Cherbourg	Second French Empire	Visiting Napoleon III
1858	August 11 — August 12	Breidenbacher Hof, Düsseldorf	Prussia	
1858	August 12	Herrenhausen	Prussia	
1858	August 12 — August 28	Babelsberg Palace, Potsdam	Prussia	Visiting George V of Hanover
1858	August 28 — August 30	Hotel de Bellevue, Cologne	Prussia	Visiting Crown Prince William of Prussia

== 1860s ==
Date(s)		Locations	Country	Details
1860	September 24 — September 25	Hotel d'Angleterre, Frankfurt	Free City of Frankfurt	
1860	September 25 — October 10	Palace, Coburg	Saxe-Coburg and Gotha	Visiting Ernest II, Duke of Saxe-Coburg and Gotha
1860	October 10 — October 11	Rheinische Hof Hotel, Mainz	Hesse	
1860	October 11 — October 13	Palace, Koblenz	Prussia	Visiting Crown Prince William of Prussia
1860	October 13 — October 16	Royal Palace of Brussels, Brussels	Belgium	Visiting Leopold I of Belgium
1862	September 2 — September 4	Royal Palace of Laeken, Laeken	Belgium	Visiting Leopold I of Belgium
1862	September 5 — October 3	Reinhardsbrunn, Friedrichroda	Saxe-Coburg and Gotha	
1862	October 3 — October 17	Palace, Coburg	Saxe-Coburg and Gotha	Visiting Ernest II, Duke of Saxe-Coburg and Gotha
1862	October 18 — October 2	Royal Palace of Laeken, Laeken	Belgium	Visiting Leopold I of Belgium
1863	August 12 — August 14	Royal Palace of Laeken, Laeken	Belgium	Visiting Leopold I of Belgium
1863	August 15 — September 7	Schloss Rosenau, Coburg, Schloss Ehrenburg, Coburg	Saxe-Coburg and Gotha	Visiting Ernest II, Duke of Saxe-Coburg and Gotha.Meeting Franz Joseph I of Austria
1865	August 11 — September 5	Schloss Rosenau, Coburg	Saxe-Coburg and Gotha	Visiting Ernest II, Duke of Saxe-Coburg and Gotha
1868	August 6	Paris	Second French Empire	
1868	August 7 — September 9	Pension Wallis, Lucerne	Switzerland	Private visit. First visit to Switzerland by a reigning British monarch.

== 1870s ==
Date(s)		Locations	Country	Details
1872	March 25 — April 6	Villa Delmar, Baden-Baden	Baden; German Empire	Visiting Princess Feodora of Leiningen
1876	March 29 — April 10	Villa Hohenlohe, Baden-Baden	Baden; German Empire	
1876	April 10 — April 20	Palace, Coburg	Saxe-Coburg and Gotha	Visiting Ernest II, Duke of Saxe-Coburg and Gotha
1876	April 10 — April 20	Palace, Coburg	German Empire	Visiting Ernest II, Duke of Saxe-Coburg and Gotha
1879	March 26 — March 27	British Embassy, Paris	French Third Republic	Receiving President Grévy
1879	March 28 — April 23	Villa Clara, Baveno	Kingdom of Italy	
1879	April 24 — April 25	British Embassy, Paris	French Third Republic	

== 1880s ==
Date(s)		Locations	Country	Details
1880	March 27 — March 30	Villa Hohenlohe, Baden-Baden	Baden	
1880	March 27 — March 30	Villa Hohenlohe, Baden-Baden	German Empire	
1880	March 30 — April 1	Schloss, Darmstadt	Grand Duchy of Hesse	Confirmations of Princess Victoria of Hesse and by Rhine and Princess Elisabeth of Hesse and by Rhine
1880	March 30 — April 1	Schloss, Darmstadt	German Empire	Confirmations of Princess Victoria of Hesse and by Rhine and Princess Elisabeth of Hesse and by Rhine
1880	April 1 — April 15	Villa Hohenlohe, Baden-Baden	Baden	
1880	April 1 — April 15	Villa Hohenlohe, Baden-Baden	German Empire	
1882	March 16 — April 12	Chalet des Rosiers, Menton	French Third Republic	
1884	April 17 — May 6	Neues Palais, Darmstadt	Grand Duchy of Hesse	Wedding of Prince Louis of Battenberg and Princess Victoria of Hesse and by Rhine
1884	April 17 — May 6	Neues Palais, Darmstadt	German Empire	
1885	April 1 — April 22	Maison Mottet, Hotel de l'Europe, Aix-les-Bains	French Third Republic	
1885	April 22	via Switzerland		
1885	April 23 — May 1	Neues Palais, Darmstadt	Grand Duchy of Hesse	Confirmation of Prince Ernest Louis of Hesse
1885	April 23 — May 1	Neues Palais, Darmstadt	German Empire	
1887	April 1 — April 4	Villa Edelweiss, Cannes	French Third Republic	
1887	April 6 — April 28	Maison Mottet, Hotel de l'Europe, Aix-les-Bains	French Third Republic	
1888	March 24 — April 22	Villa Palmieri, Fiesole, near Florence	Kingdom of Italy	
1888	April 23	Innsbruck railway station, Innsbruck	Austria-Hungary	Stopover luncheon with Franz Joseph I of Austria
1888	April 24 — April 26	Charlottenburg Palace, Berlin, Brandenburg	German Empire	Visiting Frederick III, German Emperor
1889	March 7 — March 27	Villa La Rochefoucauld, Biarritz, Basque Country	French Third Republic	
1889	March 27	San Sebastián Basque Country	Spain	Unofficial meeting with Queen Regent Maria Christina, mother of Alfonso XIII.
1889	March 27 — April 27	Villa La Rochefoucauld, Biarritz, Basque Country	French Third Republic	

== 1890s ==
Date(s)		Locations	Country	Details
1890	March 26 — April 22	Maison Mottet, Aix-les-Bains	French Third Republic	
1890	April 22	Stopovers at Geneva and Lucerne	Switzerland	
1890	April 23 — April 29	Neues Palais, Darmstadt	Grand Duchy of Hesse	Visiting Louis IV, Grand Duke of Hesse
1890	April 23 — April 29	Neues Palais, Darmstadt	German Empire	
1891	March 25 — April 29	Grand Hotel, Grasse	French Third Republic	
1892	March 21 — April 25	Grand Hotel de Costebelle, Hyères	French Third Republic	
1892	April 26 — May 2	Neues Palais, Darmstadt	Grand Duchy of Hesse	Visiting orphaned grandchildren after the death of Louis IV, Grand Duke of Hesse
1892	April 26 — May 2	Neues Palais, Darmstadt	German Empire	
1893	March 23 — April 26	Villa Palmieri, Fiesole, near Florence	Kingdom of Italy	
1894	March 16 — April 16	Villa Fabbricotti, Florence	Kingdom of Italy	
1894	April 17 — April 28	Schloss Ehrenburg, Coburg	Saxe-Coburg and Gotha	Wedding of Ernest Louis, Grand Duke of Hesse and Princess Victoria Melita of Saxe-Coburg and Gotha
1894	April 17 — April 28	Schloss Ehrenburg, Coburg	German Empire	
1895	March 15 — April 23	Grand Hotel, Cimiez, near Nice	French Third Republic	
1895	April 24 — April 29	Altes Palais, Darmstadt	Grand Duchy of Hesse	Visiting Ernest Louis, Grand Duke of Hesse
1895	April 24 — April 29	Altes Palais, Darmstadt	German Empire	
1896	March 11 — April 29	Grand Hotel, Cimiez, near Nice	French Third Republic	
1897	March 12 — April 28	Grand Hotel, Cimiez, near Nice	French Third Republic	
1898	March 12 — April 28	Grand Hotel, Cimiez, near Nice	French Third Republic	
1899	March 12 — May 2	Grand Hotel, Cimiez, near Nice	French Third Republic	

== See also ==
- List of state visits received by Queen Victoria
- List of official overseas trips made by Edward VII, her successor

== Sources ==
- Queen Victoria's Journals
