= Villa Palmieri, Fiesole =

Historic building in Florence, Italy

Coordinates: 43°47′47.85″N 11°16′41.65″E

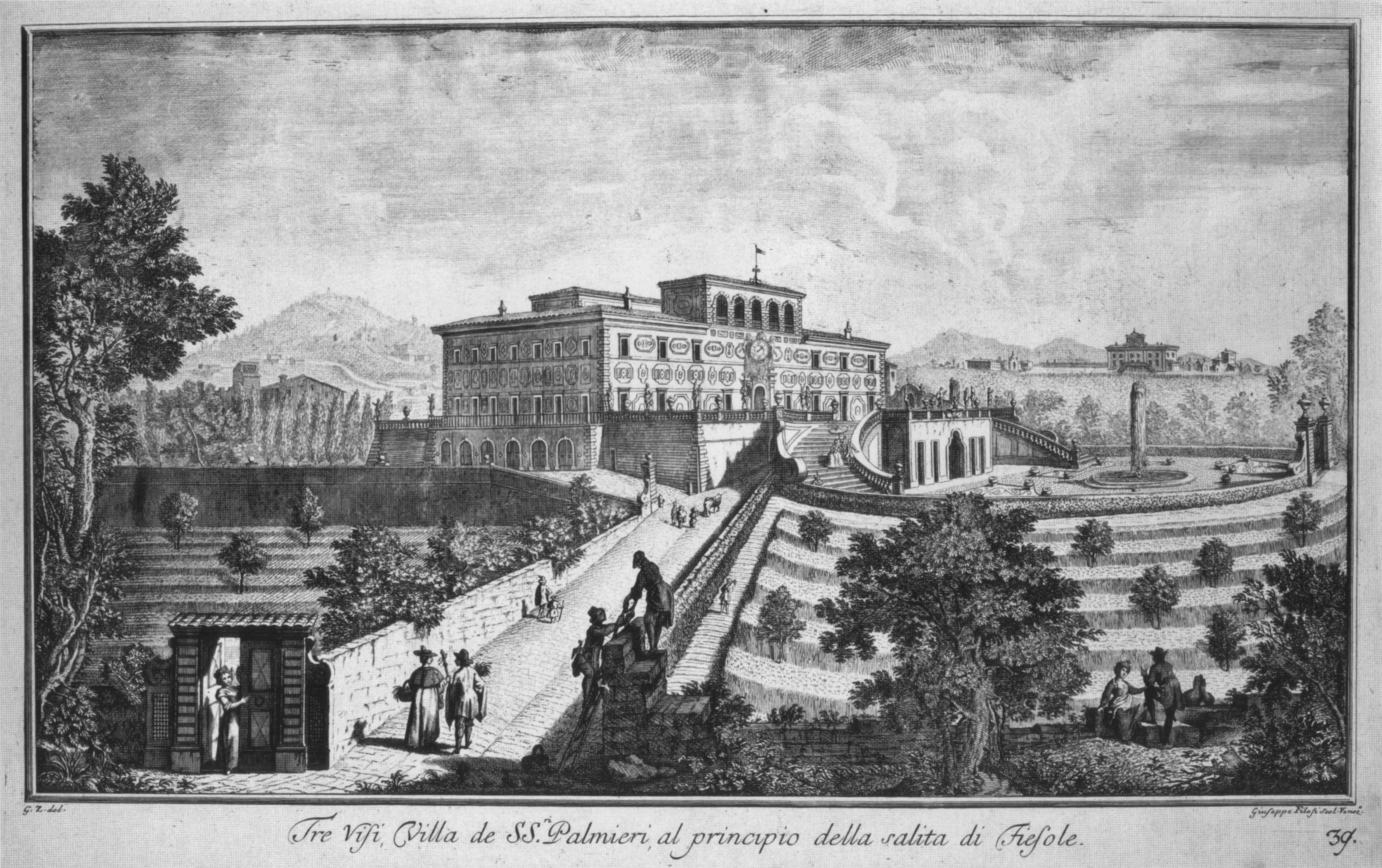
Villa Palmieri, 1744 engraving by Giuseppe Zocchi, with embellished decorations on garden facade

Villa Palmieri is a patrician villa in Fiesole, central Italy, that overlooks Florence. Its gardens, situated on the slopes below Piazza S. Domenico in Fiesole, are renowned as the paradisiacal setting for the frame story of Boccaccio's Decameron.

== History ==
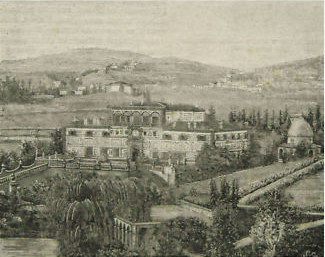
Villa Palmieri on a postcard from 1896.

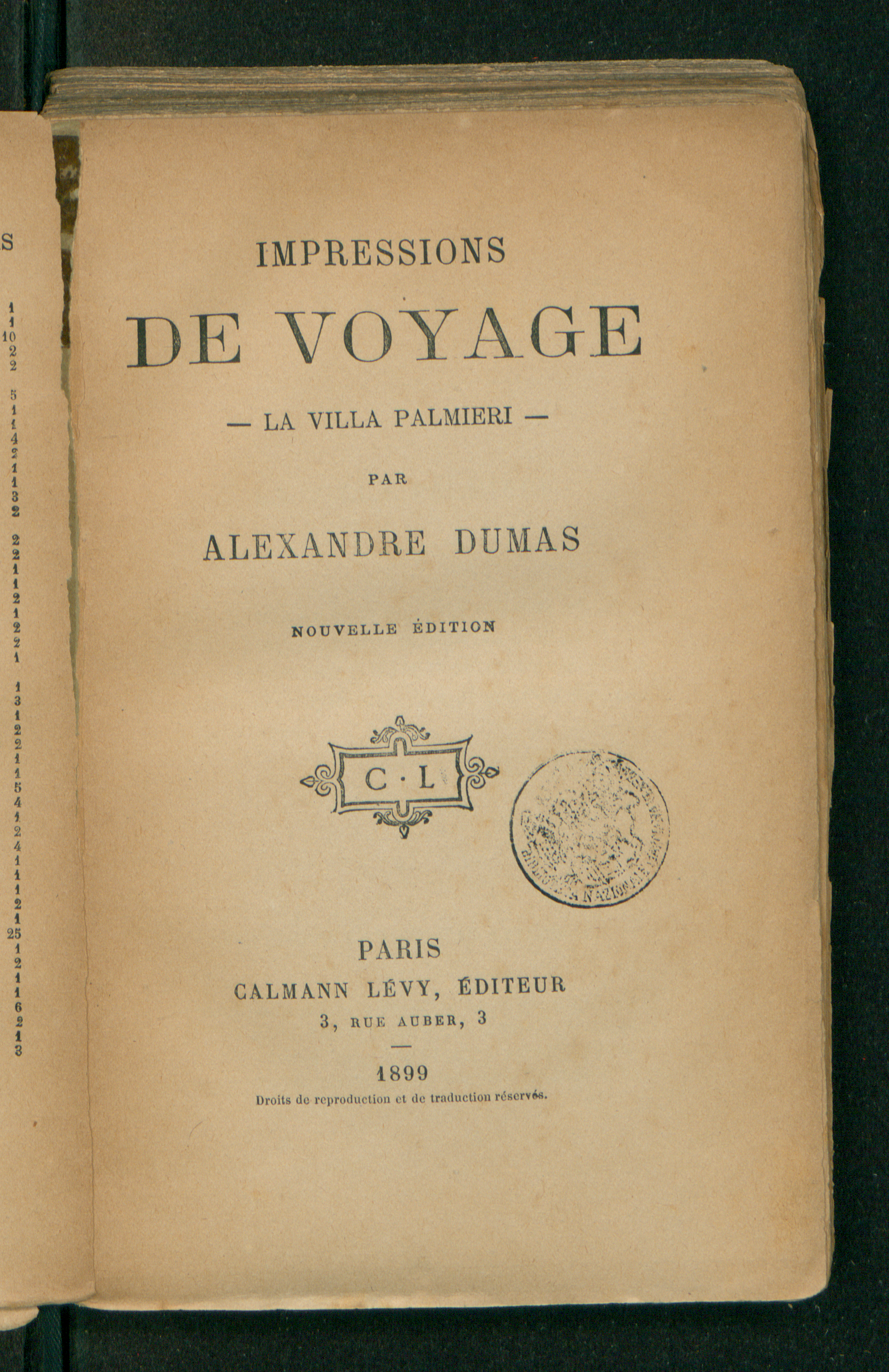
Alexandre Dumas, père, Impressions de voyage - La villa Palmieri, 1899

The villa was certainly in existence at the end of the 14th century, when it was a possession of the Fini, who sold it in 1454 to the noted humanist scholar Matteo di Marco Palmieri, whose name it still bears. In 1697, Palmiero Palmieri commenced a restructuring of the gardens, sweeping away all vestiges of the earlier garden to create a south-facing terrace, an arcaded loggia of five bays and the symmetrically paired curved stairs (a tenaglia) that lead to the lemon garden in the lower level. The often-photographed lemon garden survives, though postwar renovation stripped the baroque décor from the villa's stuccoed façade.

Boccaccio's description of the villa in Fiesole where his young people retreated from the Black Death raging in Florence to tell stories is too general to identify any one villa securely:

To see this garden, its handsome ordering, the plants, and the fountain with rivulets issuing from it, was so pleasing to each lady and the three young men that all began to affirm that, if Paradise could be made on earth, they couldn't conceive a form other than that of this garden that might be given it.

In 1760, when Florence had developed a considerable English community, the villa was acquired by the 3rd Earl Cowper. Alexandre Dumas, père spent some time there, and collected his Florentine travel essays under the title La Villa Palmieri (Paris, 1843). In 1873 it was purchased by James Ludovic Lindsay, 26th Earl of Crawford who recreated part of the grounds in the fashionable English naturalistic landscape manner of parkland dotted with specimen trees, but provided also with the exotic tender plants that could not be grown in the open in England. His commissions included also the scenic basin of the Fountain of Three Faces and a little chapel in neo-Baroque manner to one side of the villa.

"Unlike the Gamberaia", Georgina Masson observed, "Villa Palmieri has suffered from having been a 'show-place' and the alterations of many owners to suit the fashions of their day, so that little of its original character remains". Today the oldest remaining parts of Villa Palmieri are the oval geometric garden of lemons which are set out in warm weather ranged round the central circular basin, itself framed in quadrant spandrels, all framed in clipped low boxwood hedging, following an eighteenth-century engraving of this garden space by Giuseppe Zocchi. The upper terrace is supported on the vaults of the limonaia, glazed in the nineteenth century, where the lemon trees were protected from the very occasional hard frost. Some labels on trees record three visits of Queen Victoria to Villa Palmieri, in 1888, 1893 and 1894.

The villa was owned by Chicago industrialist James Ellsworth from 1907 till his death there in 1925. The Villetta, an outbuilding formerly part of the extensive Villa Palmieri grounds, was purchased in 1927 by Myron Taylor, the American ambassador to the Holy see, who recreated a Beaux-Arts version of an Italian terraced garden and named it Villa Schifanoia. The relations of the Villa and the Villetta in an earlier day are represented in the landscape background of Francesco Botticini's Assumption of the Virgin painted for Matteo Palmieri and unfinished at his death in 1475.
