= State visits of Queen Elizabeth =

State visits of Queen Elizabeth may refer to:

== Outgoing state visits ==
- List of official overseas trips made by Queen Elizabeth the Queen Mother § Trips as Queen
  - 1939 royal tour of Canada
- List of Commonwealth official trips made by Elizabeth II
  - 1953–1954 royal tour of New Zealand
  - 2002 royal tour of Canada
- List of state visits made by Elizabeth II
  - List of state visits made by Elizabeth II to the United States
  - State visit by Elizabeth II to China, 1986
  - State visit by Elizabeth II to Spain, 1988
  - State visit by Elizabeth II to Russia, 1994
  - State visit by Elizabeth II to the Republic of Ireland, 2011

== Incoming state visits ==
- List of state visits received by Elizabeth II
  - State visit by Juan Carlos I to the United Kingdom, 1986
  - State visit by Jiang Zemin to the United Kingdom, 1999
  - State visit by Vladimir Putin to the United Kingdom, June 2003
  - State visit by George W. Bush to the United Kingdom, November 2003
  - State visit by Hu Jintao to the United Kingdom, 2005
  - State visit by Pope Benedict XVI to the United Kingdom, 2010
  - State visit by Barack Obama to the United Kingdom, 2011
  - State visit by Michael D. Higgins to the United Kingdom, 2014
  - State visit by Xi Jinping to the United Kingdom, 2015
  - 2019 state visit by Donald Trump to the United Kingdom

== See also ==
- List of official overseas trips made by Queen Elizabeth the Queen Mother § Trips as Queen Mother
- State visits to the United Kingdom
