= List of state visits received by Charles III =

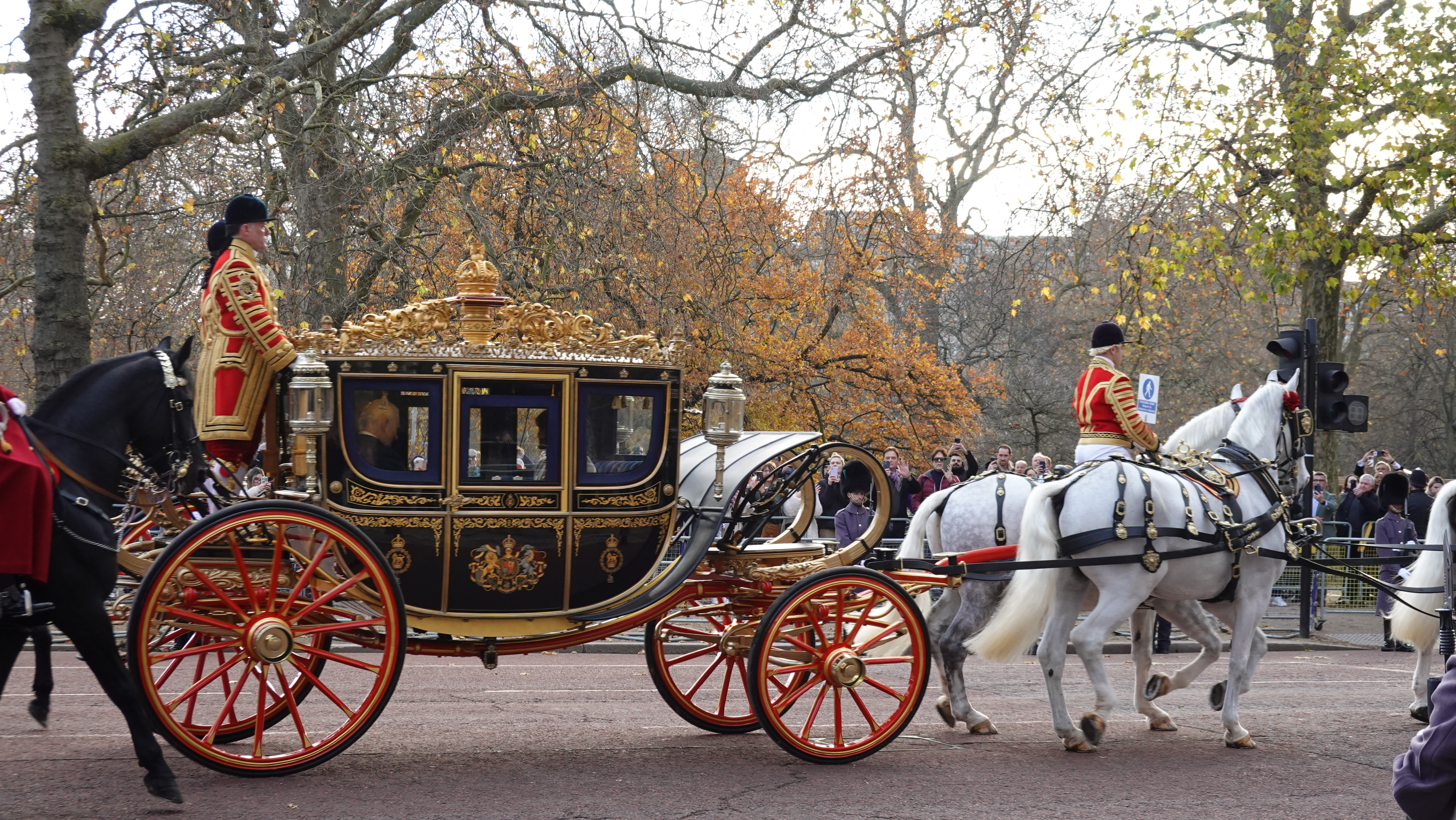
King Charles welcomed the Emir of Qatar and his wife Sheikha Jawaher bint Hamad Al Thani during a state visit held in December 2024

Since acceding to the thrones of the Commonwealth realms in 2022, King Charles III has been responsible for receiving state and official visits.

== Summary ==
As of 20 October 2026, the number of official state visits received by Charles III are:

- One: France, Germany, Japan, Nigeria, Oman, Qatar, South Africa, South Korea, and the United States.

World map highlighting the countries received by Charles III during his reign: (18 March 2026) United Kingdom Other Commonwealth realms One visit

== List of visits ==
#	Date	Country	Regime	Guests	Venue for State Banquet	Image
2020s
1	22–23 November 2022	South Africa	Republic	President Cyril Ramaphosa	Buckingham Palace	
2	21–23 November 2023	South Korea	Republic	President Yoon Suk Yeol; First Lady Kim Keon Hee	Buckingham Palace	
3	25–27 June 2024	Japan	Monarchy	Emperor Naruhito; Empress Masako	Buckingham Palace	
4	3–4 December 2024	Qatar	Monarchy	Sheikh Tamim bin Hamad Al Thani; Sheikha Jawaher bint Hamad Al Thani	Buckingham Palace	
5	8–10 July 2025	France	Republic	President Emmanuel Macron; Mme Brigitte Macron	Windsor Castle	
6	16–18 September 2025	United States	Republic	President Donald Trump; First Lady Melania Trump	Windsor Castle	
7	3–5 December 2025	Germany	Republic	President Frank-Walter Steinmeier; Mme Elke Büdenbender	Windsor Castle	
8	18–19 March 2026	Nigeria	Republic	President Bola Tinubu; First Lady Remi Tinubu	Windsor Castle	
9	20–22 October 2026	Oman	Monarchy	Sultan Haitham bin Tariq	Windsor Castle	

== Upcoming state visits ==
#	Date	Country	Regime	Guests	Venue for State Banquet	Image

== Countries that have made state visits ==
Countries	State Visits
France	1
Germany	1
Japan	1
Nigeria	1
Oman	1
Qatar	1
South Africa	1
South Korea	1
United States	1

== See also ==
- Foreign relations of the United Kingdom
- List of official overseas trips made by Charles III
- List of state visits received by Elizabeth II
- State and official visits to the United Kingdom
