= List of international presidential trips made by Donald Trump to the United Kingdom =

Donald Trump has made 2 state visits to the United Kingdom as president of the United States:

- 2019 state visit, during his first presidency
- 2025 state visit, during his second presidency
