= 1986 state visit by Elizabeth II to China =

1986 visit by the British monarch

State visit by Elizabeth II to China
- Date: 12–18 October 1986
- Location: Beijing, Shanghai, Xi'an, Kunming, Guangzhou
- Type: State visit
- Participants: Elizabeth II; Prince Philip, Duke of Edinburgh

Queen Elizabeth II of the United Kingdom of Great Britain and Northern Ireland and her husband Prince Philip, Duke of Edinburgh, made a state visit to China from 12 to 18 October 1986 at the invitation of the Chinese paramount leader, Deng Xiaoping, and the president of China, Li Xiannian. It is the first and only visit by a reigning British monarch to China.

The seven-day visit was the Queen's second visit to a communist state following the 1972 state visit to Yugoslavia.

== Background ==
The first attempt to establish relations between an English monarch and a Chinese monarch was made by Queen Elizabeth I via a letter sent to the Wanli Emperor in 1596 that was lost in a shipwreck. Another attempt at establishing relations was made by an emissary of King George III in 1793 but it was denied by the Qianlong Emperor. The British and the Qing dynasty later became opponents in the Opium Wars, which resulted in British victory and Hong Kong being handed over to Great Britain. The 1984 Sino-British Joint Declaration for the eventual handover of Hong Kong paved the way for the 1986 state visit, which was seen as an opportunity to put the historical tensions between the two countries to rest. The Chinese paramount leader, Deng Xiaoping, personally supported the idea of inviting the Queen for a visit at the time. Prime Minister Margaret Thatcher had already made an official visit in 1982.

In preparation for the visit, the Diaoyutai State Guesthouse, where the Queen would be staying, was reconstructed. A road between the centre of Beijing and the Great Wall was repaved. The Customs House clock on the Bund in Shanghai was repaired to chime the hour similar to Big Ben to "make Queen Elizabeth feel at home when she visits Shanghai". The long-neglected potholes along the route from the airport to the city centre were also repaired. Recent travellers reported that in Kunming, the former home of a past warlord had been renovated in preparation for the Queen's visit. In Xi'an, roads were resurfaced to ensure a smooth journey for her as she travelled to see the Terracotta Army.

== Events ==
The Queen left for China aboard a British Airways TriStar flight on 11 October 1986 from Heathrow Airport. They stopped in Muscat for refuelling before landing in Beijing. The Duke of Edinburgh separately boarded a British Aerospace 146 jet from Tokyo to Beijing and arrived half an hour before the Queen. An entourage of 50 accompanied the Queen on the tour. 200 members of the news media, including 40 BBC personnel, provided coverage of the visit.

On arrival, the Queen was greeted by the Chinese minister of Foreign Affairs, Wu Xueqian. The welcoming ceremony took place on the following day at Tiananmen Square in Beijing in the presence of President Li Xiannian. Security forces mostly dispersed the crowds that had gathered to see the Queen, keeping the ceremony a closed affair despite Elizabeth's wish to meet with members of the public. The Queen opted to be driven to the event in an ordinary Limousine instead of the dark-windows closed-curtain model offered by the Chinese officials. The ceremony involved military honours and the inspection of troops by the Queen followed by Li greeting his party officials. The Queen then watched a dance performance by primary school children. Later on the same day she visited the Forbidden City. In the evening she attended a state banquet hosted by Li at the Great Hall of the People. On the second day she and the Duke met the Chinese paramount leader, Deng Xiaoping, and later visited a kindergarten in Beijing. The royal couple then headed on for a walk on the Great Wall of China. They spent four nights in Beijing, and also visited the Temple of Heaven, the tombs of Ming emperors, and the Central University for Nationalities.

In Shanghai, the Queen was greeted by a musical performance by children at the airport. She later did a walkabout to greet the public on her way to the Huxinting Teahouse. Aboard HMY Britannia in Shanghai, the Queen hosted a banquet and a seminar was held for British and Chinese businessmen. After the banquet and a reception, the Queen and the Duke were joined by Li and the minister of Foreign Affairs, Wu Xueqian, watched a performance by the Royal Marines Band Service.

On 16 October, the Queen visited Xi'an and was greeted by 1,000 children dressed in traditional Chinese costumes at Xi'an Airport. She then drove past thousands gathered on the streets on her way to Lintong to see the Terracotta Army. She left for Kunming on the same day and visited some Buddhist temples on the hills near Dian Lake before watching performances by different ethnic groups in the region. In Guangzhou, the Queen watched a firework display on the children's boating lake and a performance at Guangzhou's Children's Palace. Before leaving, they held another reception aboard the royal yacht with Chinese foreign minister Wu Xueqian and the governor of Guangdong, Ye Xuanping, as guests. At the conclusion of the state visit, the royal couple sailed from Guangzhou to Hong Kong for a three-day visit to the then British overseas territory.

It was reported in the press that the Duke of Edinburgh in a conversation with a British exchange student described the Chinese capital as "ugly" and the Chinese as "slitty" eyed people who avoided mixing with foreign "barbarians", but the Chinese foreign minister Wu Xueqian responded that the royal couple "stated on many occasions that they have had a very good time in China" and "As for the remarks you mentioned, I was not present on the occasion, so I did not hear them". The Duke himself told the press "I thought the Edinburgh students were tactless" for leaking details of the conversation.

== Legacy ==
In 1999, the Queen hosted CCP General Secretary Jiang Zemin's state visit to the United Kingdom. This was followed CCP General Secretary Hu Jintao's state visit in 2005, and CCP General Secretary Xi Jinping's state visit in 2015.

== See also ==
- List of state visits made by Elizabeth II
- China–United Kingdom relations
