= List of state visits made by Elizabeth II to the United States =

Elizabeth II has made four state visits to the United States as Queen of the United Kingdom:

- 1957 state visit
- 1976 state visit
- 1991 state visit
- 2007 state visit

== See also ==
- State visits of Queen Elizabeth (disambiguation)
