= State visit by Emmanuel Macron to the United Kingdom =

2025 state visit by President of France

- Date: 8 to 10 July 2025
- Location: Windsor; London
- Type: State visit
- Participants: President Emmanuel Macron; Brigitte Macron; King Charles III; Queen Camilla

French President Emmanuel Macron and his wife, Brigitte, visited the United Kingdom from 8 to 10 July 2025. They were welcomed by King Charles III and Queen Camilla at Windsor Castle. This was the first state visit to the UK by a French president since 2008 and the first by a European Union leader since Brexit.

During the visit, Macron met UK Prime Minister Keir Starmer and opposition party leaders, addressed the UK parliament and also attended the 37th UK-France Summit.

== Background ==
In September 2023, King Charles III and Queen Camilla had paid a state visit to France, which was described as a diplomatic success in helping to rebuild relations after Brexit.

Macron's visit to UK was seen as a further effort by the UK Labour government to reinforce links with a European ally, against a background of uncertainty about negotiations over Ukraine and the threat of tariffs from the United States, as well as joint efforts to stop illegal migrants from crossing the Channel in small boats. Starmer's office said the visit would showcase "the breadth of the existing relationship" between Britain and France, while Macron hailed an "important moment for our two nations" on X.

== Programme ==
=== 8 July: Met King Charles III, addressed the parliament and state dinner ===
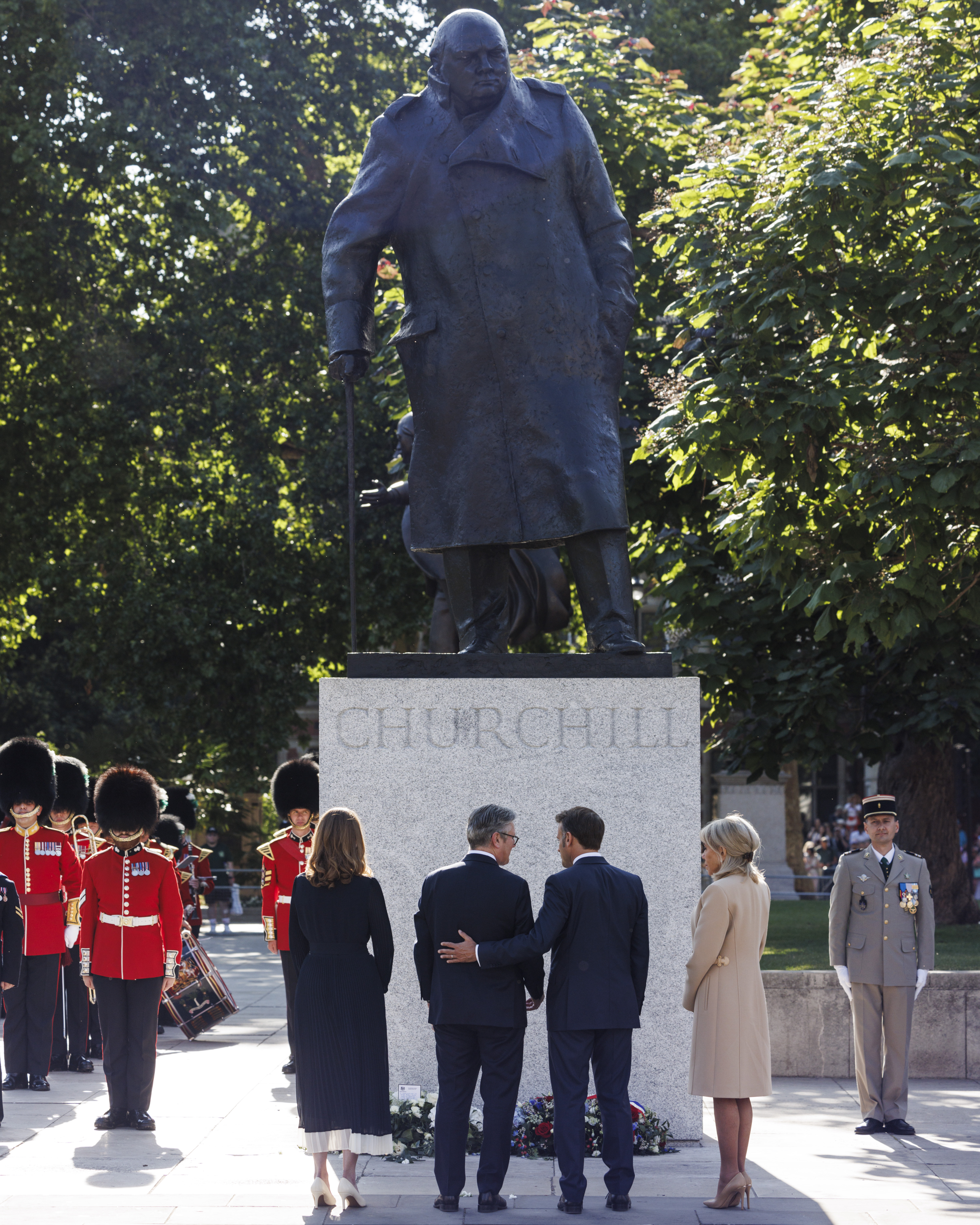
Laying a wreath at the Statue of Winston Churchill, Parliament Square on 8 July

On 8 July, Macron and his wife Brigitte were greeted off the presidential plane at RAF Northolt by Prince William and Catherine, Princess of Wales. The King and Queen later formally welcomed the couple at Windsor Castle, where they rode in a horse-drawn carriage and reviewed a military guard of honour. Gun Salutes were fired in the Home Park by The King's Troop Royal Horse Artillery and at the Tower of London by the Honourable Artillery Company to mark the visit. After the lunch, the President and Mrs. Macron viewed a special display of French related items from the Royal Collection.

Afterwards, they departed for London and visited Westminster Abbey for a tour, where the President laid a wreath at the Grave of the Unknown Warrior. The President visited the Palace of Westminster, where he addressed both Houses of Parliament, telling lawmakers that France and the UK need to work together to protect the world order established after World War II. The presidential couple, accompanied by Prime Minister Keir Starmer and Victoria Starmer, laid wreaths at the statues of Winston Churchill and Charles de Gaulle. Later, Macron met Kemi Badenoch (Leader of the Opposition) and Edward Davey (Leader of the Liberal Democrats) at Lancaster House.

In the evening, the President and Mrs. Macron were guests of honour at a state banquet hosted by the King and Queen at Windsor Castle along with 160 guests.

=== 9 July: No. 10 Downing Street lunch, business summits and migration issues ===
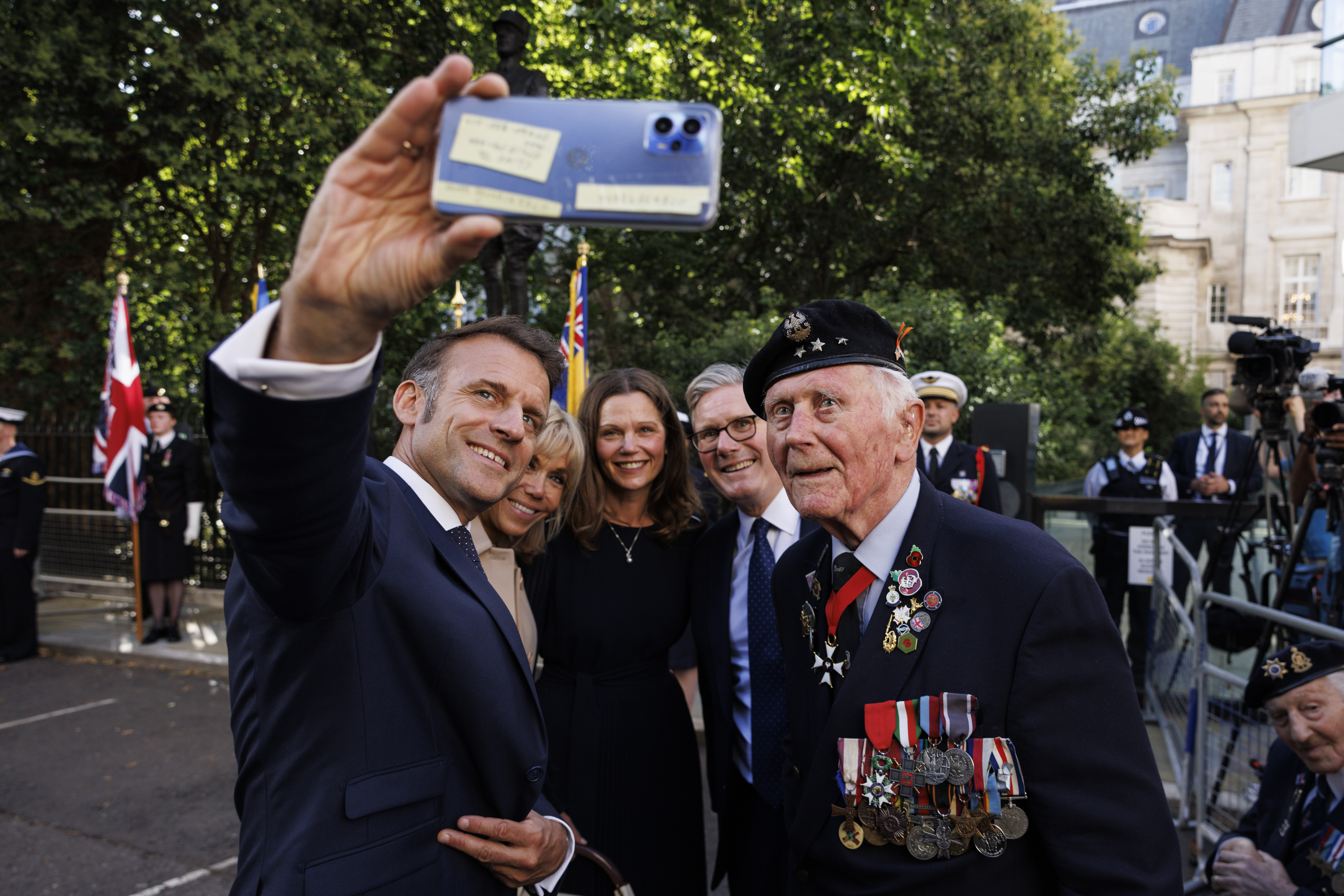
The Macrons and Starmers taking a selfie with a British veteran after laying a wreath at the Statue of Charles de Gaulle, London.

The Macrons began the second day by paying their respects at the tomb of Queen Elizabeth II at St George's Chapel. Macron then discussed biodiversity with the king during a stroll in the castle grounds before he bade farewell to his host and headed to central London. The President visited Imperial College, viewed the Artificial Intelligence and Emerging Technology Innovators Exhibition and met university and research leaders. President Emmanuel Macron held talks with Prime Minister Keir Starmer about the issue of small-boat crossings of the English Channel after the lunch at No. 10 Downing Street. The two leaders agreed on the need to go further and make progress on new and innovative solutions.

The President and the Prime Minister afterwards joined a business discussion and attended a reception with United Kingdom and French Chief Executive Officers. Later, Macron held meetings with United Kingdom business leaders at the Residence of the French Ambassador. At the end of the day, the President and Brigitte Macron, jointed by the Duke and Duchess of Gloucester, went to Guildhall for a dinner hosted by Alastair King, Lord Mayor of London.

=== 10 July: UK-France Summit ===
The President attended the 37th United Kingdom-France Summit at 10 Downing Street with the Prime Minister, then they went to the Northwood base to visit the operations room of NATO’s Maritime Command. After that, the two leaders took part in a virtual meeting of the coalition of willing countries to discuss various international issues and later held a joint press conference, where they announced tougher migration controls, ending a state visit with deals on defence, nuclear cooperation and plans to support Ukraine in case of a ceasefire.

== See also ==
- List of international presidential trips made by Emmanuel Macron
