= State visit by Vladimir Putin to the United Kingdom =

2003 visit by the Russian president

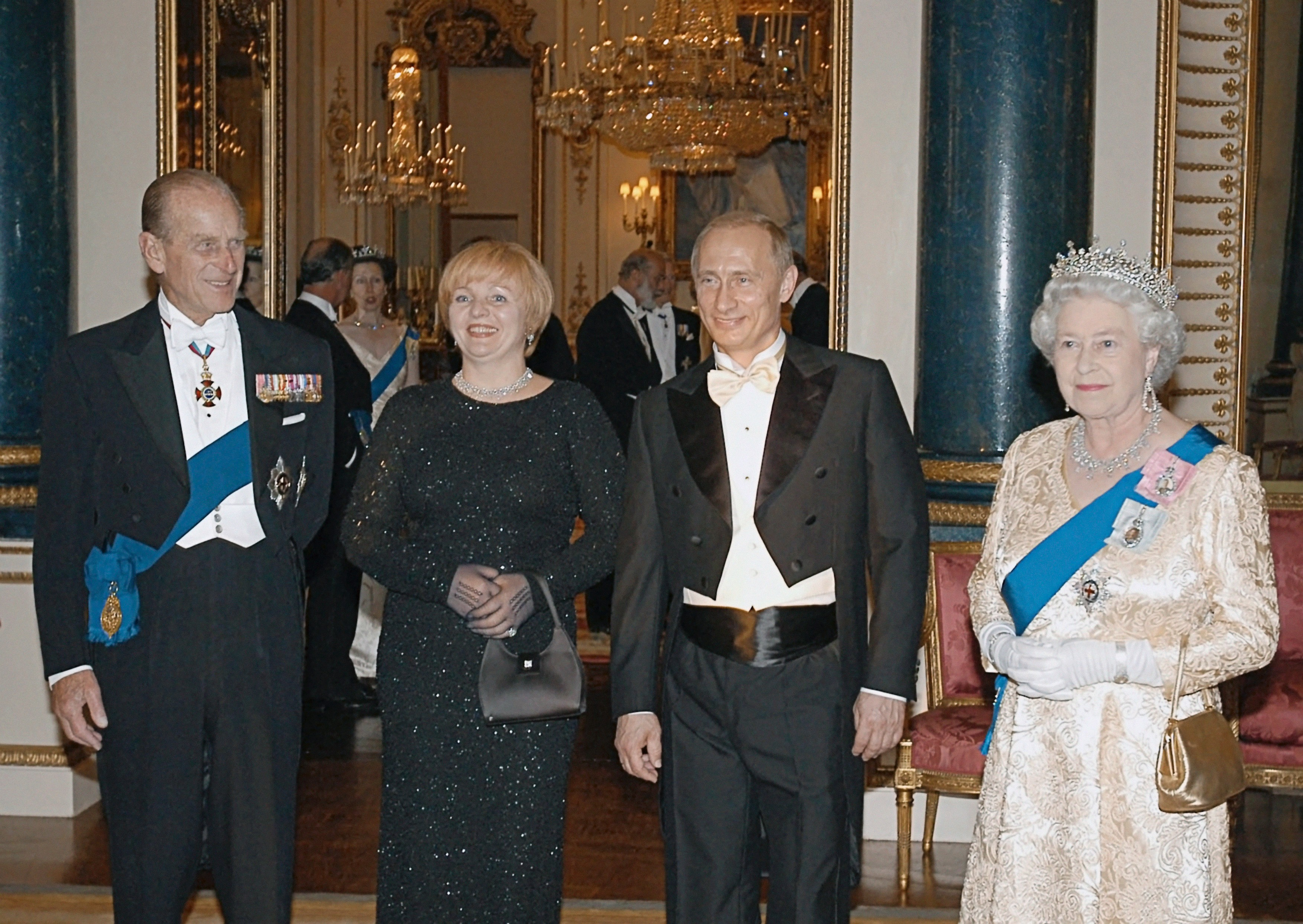
- Date: 24 to 27 June 2003
- Location: London, Edinburgh
- Type: State visit
- Participants: Vladimir Putin; Lyudmila Putina

President Vladimir Putin of Russia and his then-wife Lyudmila Putina made a state visit to the United Kingdom from 24 to 27 June 2003, hosted by the British monarch, Queen Elizabeth II. It is the first and so far only visit by a post-imperial Russian head of state on British soil. The previous state visit by a Russian head of state had taken place in 1874 by Tsar Alexander II. Elizabeth II had made her own state visit to Russia in 1994.

== Events ==
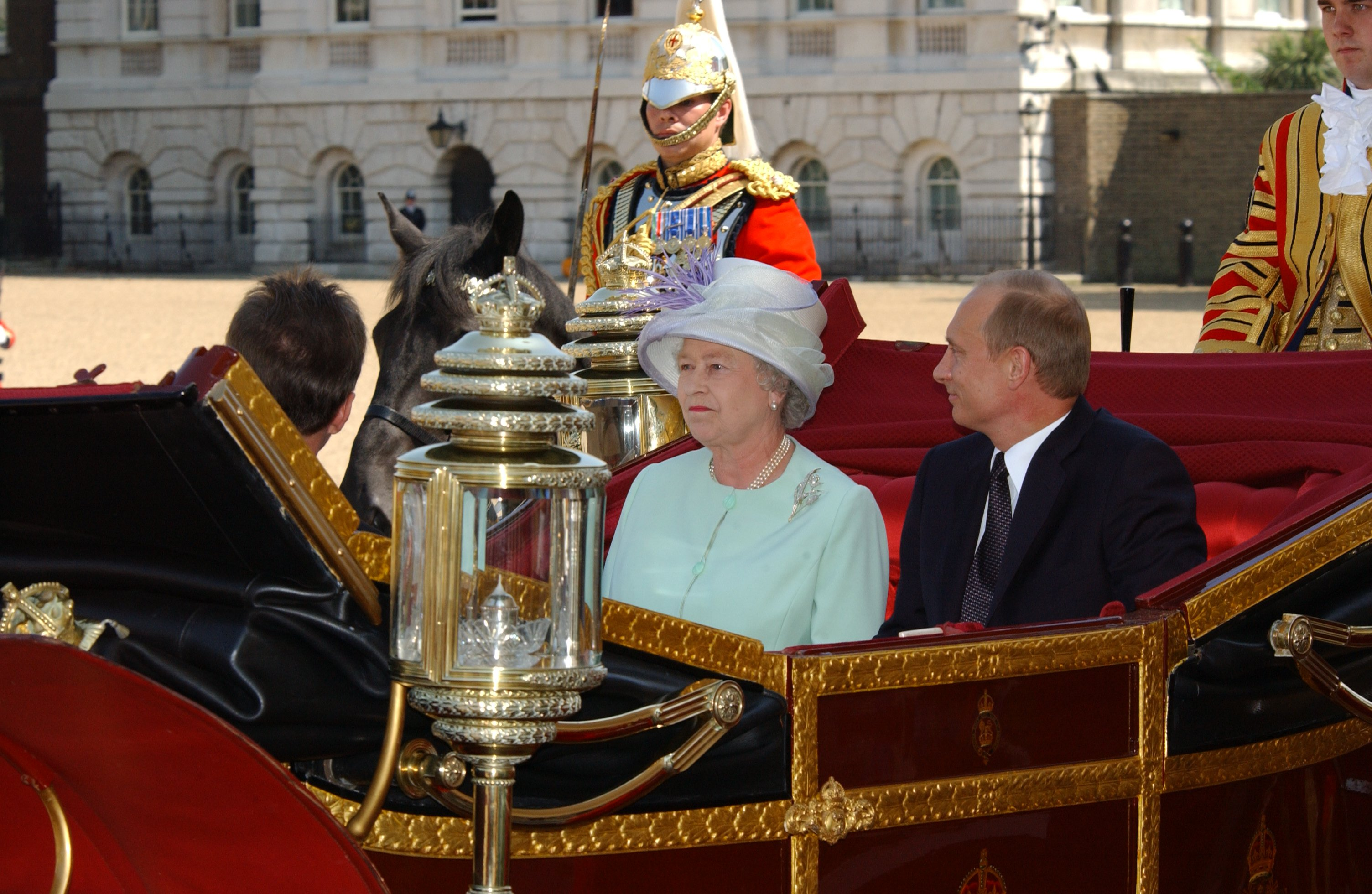
The Queen and the President leaving Horse Guards Parade

The state visit came as the relations between President Vladimir Putin and Prime Minister Tony Blair slightly improved following earlier disagreements over the Iraq War, to which Russia was opposed. Ahead of the state visit, Putin sat for an interview with the BBC. On 24 June, Putin and his then-wife Lyudmila Putina arrived at Heathrow Airport where they were received by Charles, Prince of Wales. They then attended a formal welcoming ceremony by Queen Elizabeth II and Prince Philip, Duke of Edinburgh, at Horse Guards Parade. The couples then journeyed to Buckingham Palace in horse-drawn carriages. Amnesty International and other human rights groups raised concerns about the visit, citing Putin's role as a former KGB chief and human rights abuses in Chechnya.

At the palace, the president was presented with the banner of the Pavlovsky Life Guards Regiment, which had been in the temporary custody of the Grenadier Guards since 1958 and was marked for return to Russia once the Soviet government was no longer in power. The President and the First Lady then visited Westminster Abbey, laying a wreath at the tomb of the Unknown Warrior. The President then laid a wreath at a memorial created by Sergei Shcherbakov honouring Soviet people who died during the Second World War. In the afternoon, Putin met the leader of the Conservative Party, Iain Duncan Smith, and the Liberal Democrats leader, Charles Kennedy. In the evening, the President and the First Lady were hosted by the Queen for a state banquet at the palace. At the banquet, Putin made a rare statement in English: "I would like to express to Her Majesty, the Queen, and the people of the United Kingdom, our sincere condolences with the loss of the British soldiers in Iraq. It is clear for everyone that in spite of the differences that existed before, today we need to act jointly." The couple then stayed at the palace as guests of the Queen.

On 25 June, Putin and his wife visited Edinburgh Castle alongside the First Minister of Scotland, Jack MacConnell, and Putin later met Scottish businesspeople at the Signet Library. The President and the First Lady then visited the Holyroodhouse Palace and viewed an exhibition of jewelry by Karl Fabergé. The couple then attended a reception by the Lord Mayor of London at Guildhall, London.

On 26 June, Putin and Blair opened a conference on British-Russian energy partnerships at Lancaster House, called "Russia-UK: Long-Term Partnership". Putin then visited St Paul's Cathedral and was joined by his wife on a visit to the Tower of London. Putin then had one-on-one talks with Blair at 10 Downing Street. Blair had previously expressed his desire to discuss with Putin the issue of human rights in Chechnya while acknowledging Russia's right to fight Chechen terrorists. Other topics up for discussion were reported to be the Russian support for Iran's nuclear programme. The President was then accompanied by Prince Andrew on a visit to the Russian frigate Neustrashimy. He then visited the house of John Flamsteed, the gallery of John Harrison, and the Greenwich Observatory. Putin and his wife then met with Blair and his wife Cherie Blair for an informal meeting. The President and the First Lady then held a reception at Spencer House for the Queen and the Duke of Edinburgh, which was also attended by Princes Charles and Andrew.

== See also ==
- List of state visits received by Elizabeth II
- Monarchism in Russia
- Russia–United Kingdom relations
