= State visit by Hu Jintao to the United Kingdom =

- Date: 8–10 November 2005
- Venue: London
- Participants: Hu Jintao; Liu Yongqing

CCP general secretary Hu Jintao paid his first and only state visit to the United Kingdom from 8 to 10 November 2005. It also was the Chinese paramount leader's first visit to the United Kingdom since 1999. During the visit, Hu met Queen Elizabeth II and Prime Minister Tony Blair. This was the first stop on Hu's tour of foreign partners that took him to Germany, Spain and South Korea.

== Process ==
Hu Jintao and his wife Liu Yongqing arrived at Heathrow Airport on 8 November 2005 and were greeted by the Chinese ambassador, Princess Anne and Commodore Timothy Laurence. On arrival, Hu issued a written speech, highlighting the further development of relations between China and the UK. He was then taken to the Horse Guards Parade where he was formally welcomed by the Queen and inspected a guard of honour by the 1st Battalion Irish Guards accompanied by Prince Philip, Duke of Edinburgh. The couple then attended a state banquet hosted by the Queen in the evening. Accompanying Hu for the events was the State Councilor, Tang Jiaxuan. In his speech at the banquet, Hu stated "Continued growth of our bilateral relations has delivered tangible benefits to the two peoples". The couple stayed at Buckingham Palace during the visit. Hu separately met the Liberal Democrat and Conservative leaders, Charles Kennedy and Michael Howard, respectively.

On their journey to Buckingham Palace the entourage went past a series of demonstrations composed of both pro- and anti-Chinese government demonstrators. Specifically opposing Hu's visits were groups of pro-Tibet and democracy activists, such as Free Tibet campaigners and Falun Gong spiritualists, who protested against the one-party state's treatment of political dissidents and highlighted Hu's role in suppressing separatists' protests by declaring martial law in his capacity as Party Committee secretary for the Tibet Autonomous Region. This was in contrast to the 1999 Chinese state visit when the British authorities had seized banners and taken protestors out of the view of then Chinese leader Jiang Zemin. The police apprehended a demonstrator from the pro-China rally that had infiltrated the pro-Tibetan side and started to wave the Chinese flag. Around the time for the trip, The Mail on Sunday published entries from the diaries of Prince Charles that detailed his account of the 1997 handover of Hong Kong, in which he described the speech by then-Chinese president Jiang Zemin as "propaganda" and the ceremonies as an "awful Soviet-style" performance.

Amnesty International also issued a plea to Tony Blair to discuss human rights issues in China with Hu. On 9 November, Hu Jintao addressed both houses of the United Kingdom Parliament at the Queen's Robing Room. He then visited Blair at 10 Downing Street where they discussed China–UK and China–EU relations as well as regional and international issue affecting the two countries. Further protests took place outside the prime minister's residence with demonstrators waving Tibetan flags. In the afternoon, Hu Jintao and his wife joined the Queen and the Duke of Edinburgh to attend the opening ceremony of China: The Three Emperors, 1662-1795, an exhibition held at the Royal Academy of Arts. Hu then delivered a speech at the City Hall before attending a banquet held by the Lord Mayor of London, Michael Savory, in his honour. On 10 November, Hu met with Deputy UK prime minister John Prescott, President of China–Britain Business Council (CBBC) Lord Powell and President of the 48 Group Club Stephen Perry to discuss bilateral cooperations between the two countries in the fields of trade and economy.

== See also ==
- China–United Kingdom relations
- Foreign relations of China
- Foreign relations of the United Kingdom
