= State visit by Jiang Zemin to the United Kingdom =

- Date: 19–22 October 1999
- Venue: London, Cambridge
- Participants: Jiang Zemin; Wang Yeping

CCP general secretary Jiang Zemin paid his first and only state visit to the United Kingdom from 19 to 22 October 1999. This was the first state visit by a Chinese paramount leader to the United Kingdom. During the visit, Jiang met Queen Elizabeth II and Prime Minister Tony Blair. This was the first stop in a tour that later took the paramount leader to France, Portugal, Morocco, Algeria and Saudi Arabia. Jiang's three principles for the development of China–UK relations included the development of further bilateral relations, promotions of economic ties and trade, and enhancing mutual understanding and exchanges in all fields.

== Process ==
Jiang Zemin and his wife Wang Yeping attended a formal welcoming ceremony on 19 October at the Horse Guards Parade where they were received by the Queen, Prince Philip, Duke of Edinburgh, and Prime Minister Tony Blair. There he inspected a guard of honour accompanied by the Duke of Edinburgh. Protests were held against the visit over Tibet and Chinese human rights abuses and as the party was on its way to Buckingham Palace two pro-Tibetan protestors went over the barriers but were taken by the police before reaching the coach. According to Scotland Yard, one of them was detained and another arrest was made in a separate incident. Tibetan flags and anti-Chinese banners were seized by the police ahead of the welcoming ceremony. A small lunch was served to the guests at the palace, and Jiang Zemin received "a specially bound facsimile edition" of King Charles I's copy of the second folio of Shakespeare's plays, while his wife Wang Yeping received "a sycamore jewellery box" made by David Armstrong-Jones, Viscount Linley. At the state banquet at Buckingham Palace, the Queen praised the Chinese leader's policies for "modernisation and development" and added "During our lifetimes our two countries have trodden very different paths... Britain and China have both been shaped by their long, rich pasts and strong traditions which have, in different ways, contributed so much to world civilisation". 200 protestors, including Free Tibet campaigners, gathered outside the palace during the banquet. The Chinese leader stayed at the palace afterwards, although he had first arrived at a hotel where two people were arrested. The Chinese foreign ministry had warned the UK government earlier to keep protests under control. Nobel peace prize nominee Wei Jingsheng had urged the British government to not just focus on trade and raise human rights issues as a topic of discussion.

In the morning of 20 October, Jiang Zemin travelled along Thames and visited the Millennium Dome and the Royal Observatory, Greenwich, where protestors were again kept away. On the following day, he met Prime Minister Tony Blair and leaders of the UK's opposition parties and had lunch with Blair, Rupert Murdoch, and the departing BBC director general, John Birt. According to a UK government spokesperson, "(Human rights) did not define the meeting" but out of the 45-minute meeting between Jiang and Blair, 10 minutes were dedicated to human rights issues, covering topics such as opening a dialogue with the Dalai Lama and the Himalayan region being granted power to handle its internal affairs. Demonstrators again gathered outside the prime minister's residence, forcing Jiang to use a side entrance to avoid the crowds. In the afternoon he joined the Queen for the opening of a Chinese exhibition at the British Museum and later hosted a state banquet in her honour at the Chinese embassy in London. Protestors managed to throw eggs at the Chinese leader as he arrived at the museum. Prince Charles, a known admirer of the Dalai Lama, had attended the state banquet at Buckingham Palace but declined the invitation to the banquet at the Chinese embassy citing prior engagements and denying his absence was a "snub". On 22 October, he bid farewell to the Queen at Buckingham Palace before departing for Cambridge. The police cleared protestors before Jiang arrived for a visit to parts of the University of Cambridge devoted to Asian studies. Human rights campaigners submitted written complaints to the commissioner of police of the Metropolis, Sir Paul Condon, about the way his officers handled protests.

== See also ==
- China–United Kingdom relations
- Foreign relations of China
- Foreign relations of the United Kingdom
