= List of royal visits to New Zealand =

Royal visits to New Zealand by members of the Royal Family have been taking place since 1869. The first member of the Royal Family to visit New Zealand was Prince Alfred, Duke of Edinburgh. Subsequently, there have been over 50 visits. The first reigning monarch of New Zealand to visit the country was Elizabeth II in 1953–54. In all, she visited New Zealand on 10 occasions, the last being in 2002.

== Victoria's reign ==
- 1869: Prince Alfred, Duke of Edinburgh
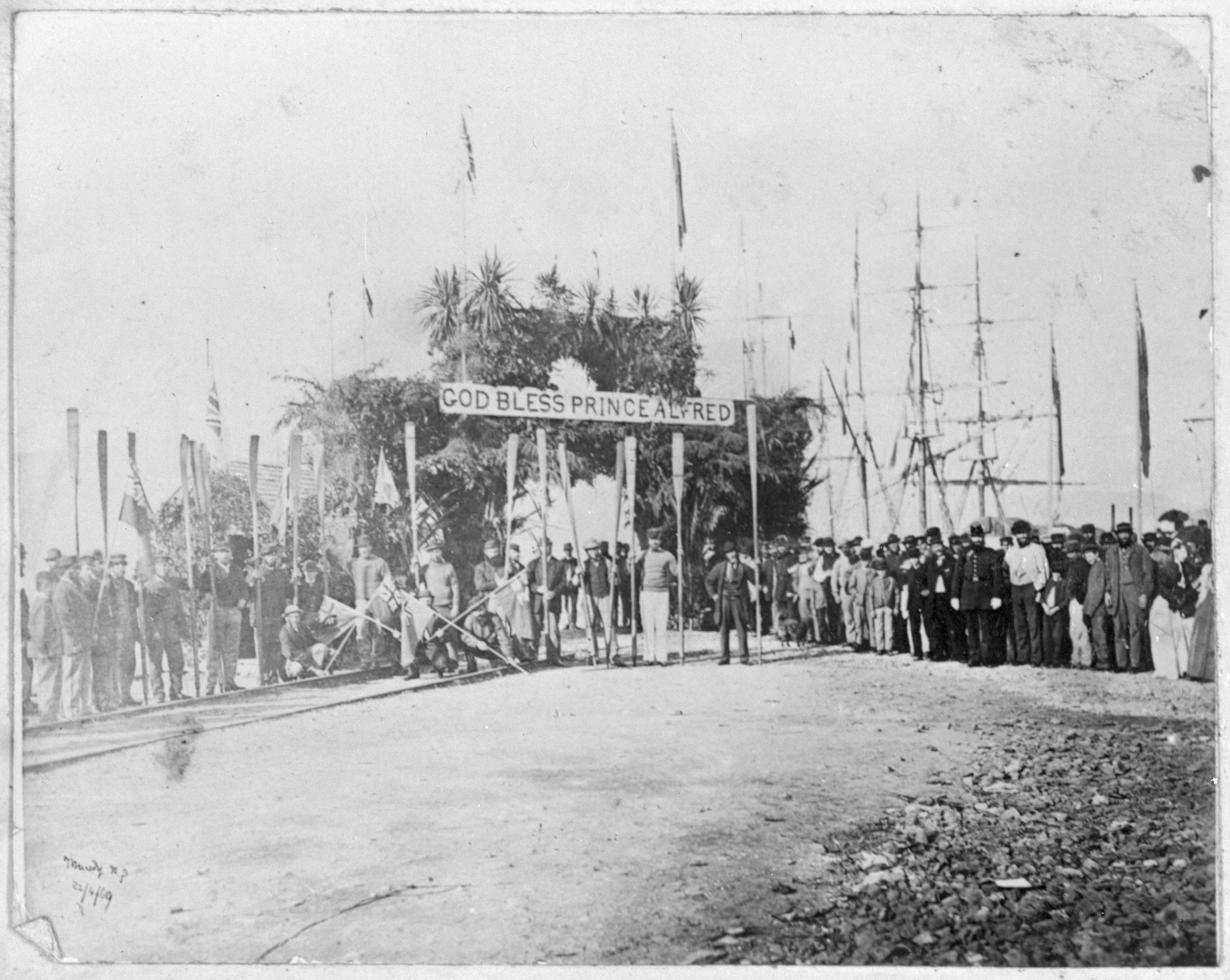
  Triumphal arch in Lyttelton for the visit of Prince Alfred in 1869
- 1870: Prince Alfred, Duke of Edinburgh
- 1871: Prince Alfred, Duke of Edinburgh

== Edward VII's reign ==
- 1901: The Duke and Duchess of Cornwall and York

== George V's reign ==
- 1920: Edward, Prince of Wales
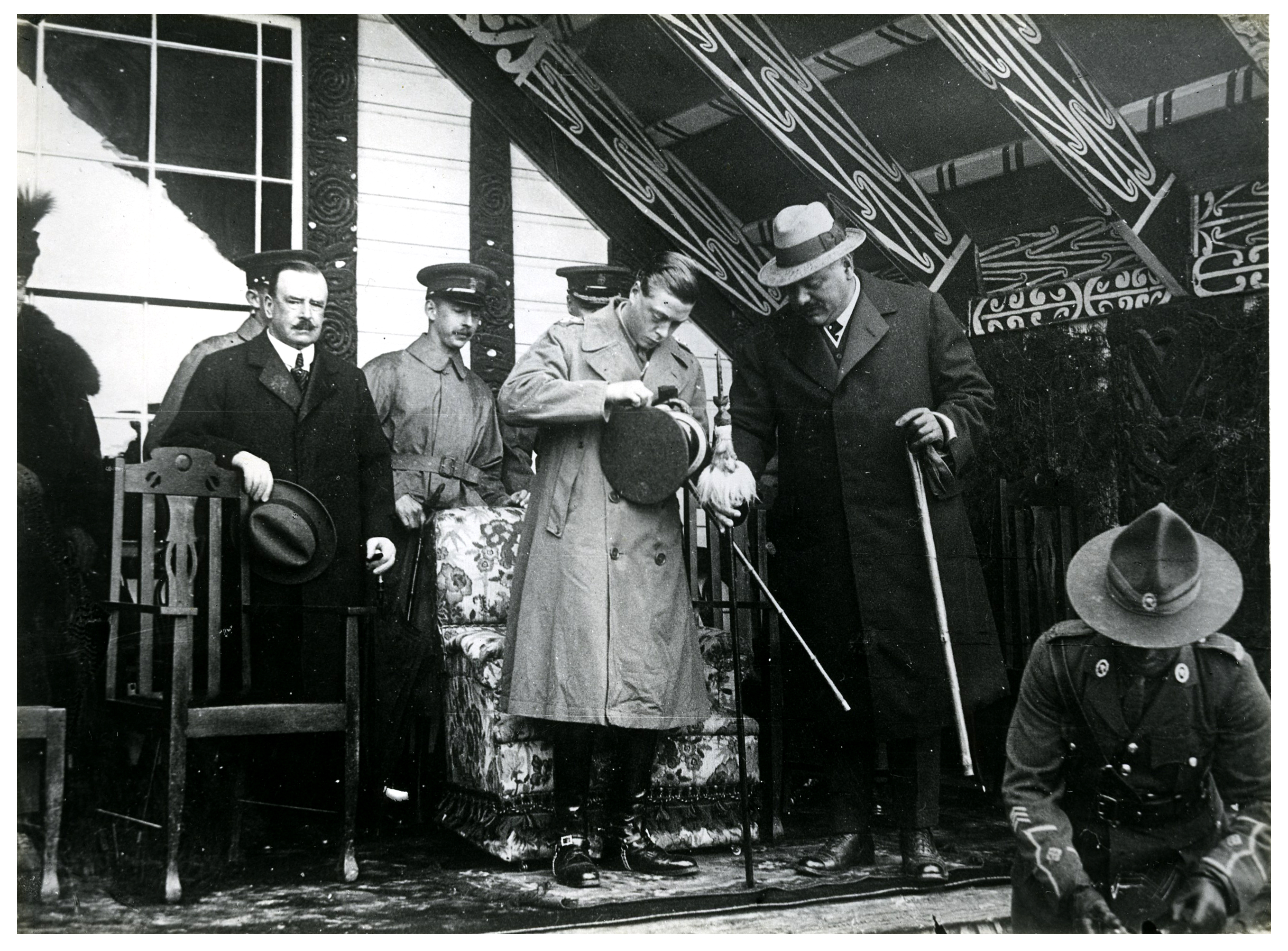
  The Prince of Wales at Rotorua on his 1920 visit to New Zealand. On the left is Sir Joseph Ward, and on the right is Māui Pōmare.
- 1927: Duke and Duchess of York
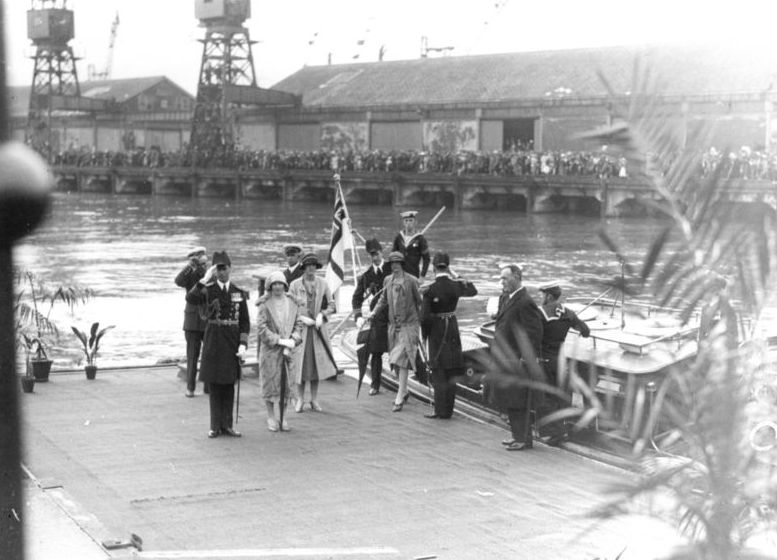
  The Duke and Duchess of York in Auckland on their 1927 visit to New Zealand
- 1934–1935: Prince Henry, Duke of Gloucester
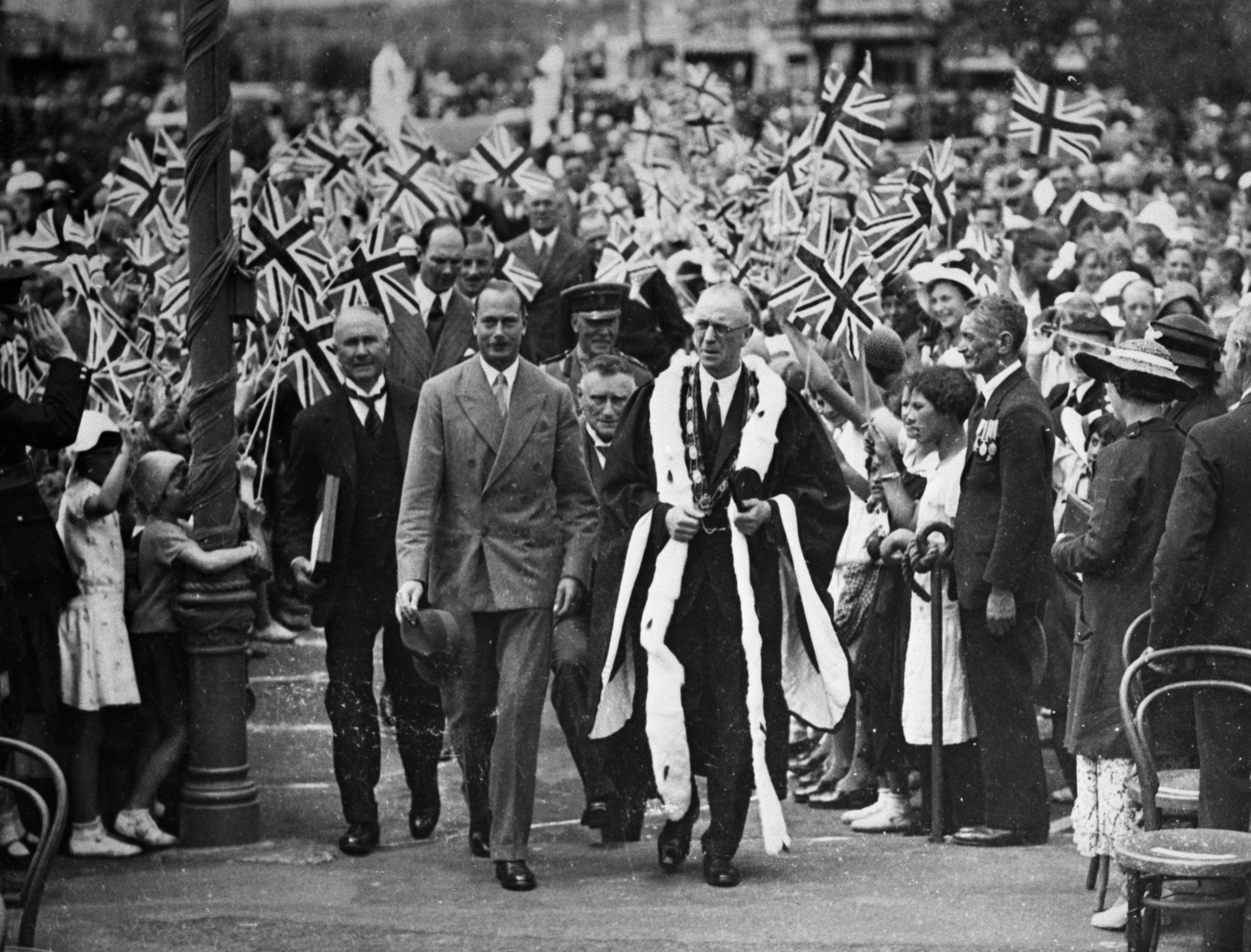
  The Duke of Gloucester in Palmerston North during his visit to New Zealand in 1935, accompanied by the mayor of Palmerston North, Gus Mansford

== Elizabeth II's reign ==
- 23 December 1953 – 31 January 1954: Elizabeth II and the Duke of Edinburgh
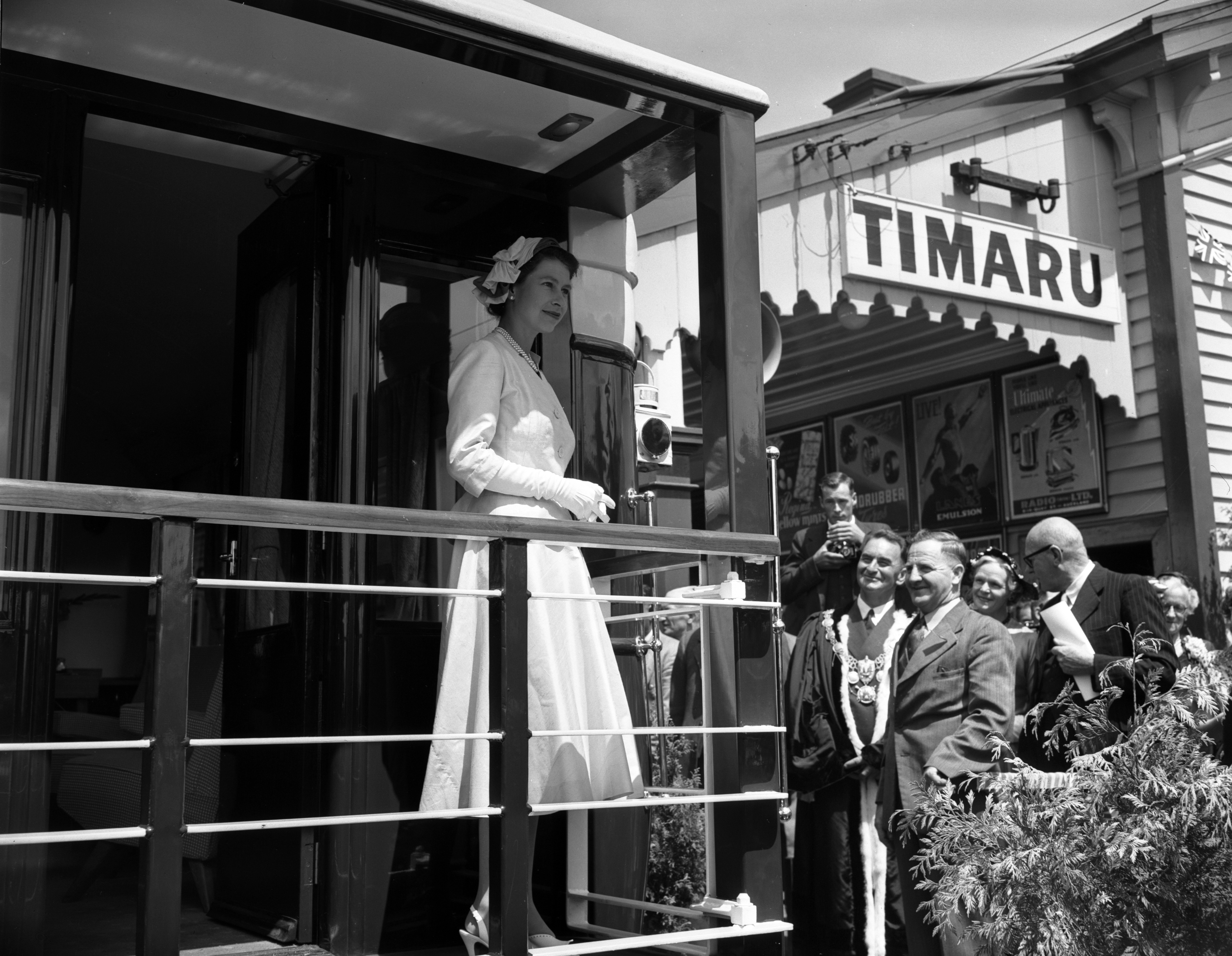
  The Queen on the Royal Train at Timaru Railway Station during her 1953–54 tour of New Zealand
- 1956: Duke of Edinburgh
- 1958: Queen Elizabeth the Queen Mother
- 6–18 February 1963: Elizabeth II and the Duke of Edinburgh
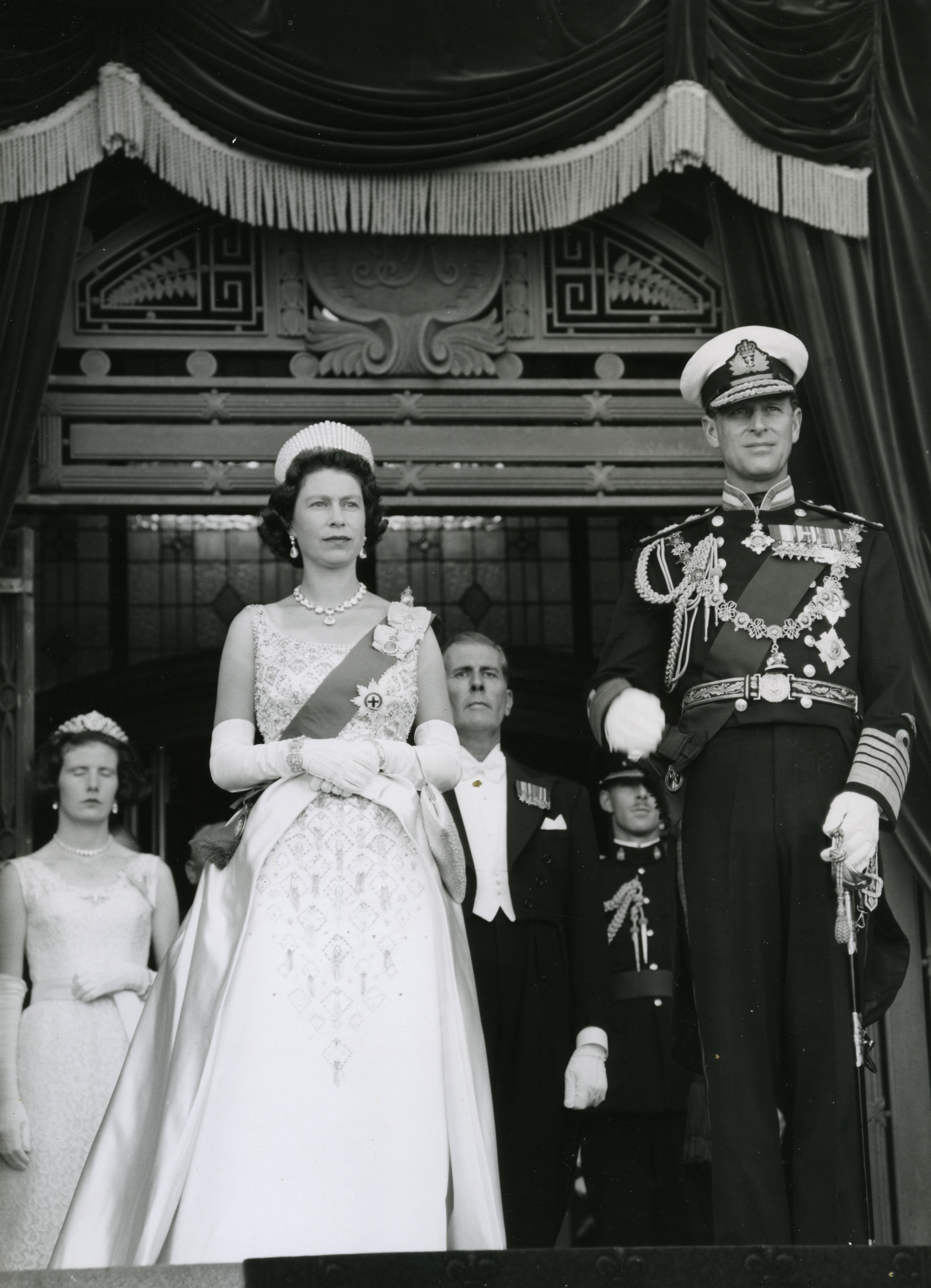
  The Queen and the Duke of Edinburgh at the State Opening of Parliament in Wellington during their 1963 visit to New Zealand
- 1966: Queen Elizabeth the Queen Mother
- 1968: Duke of Edinburgh
- 12–30 March 1970: Elizabeth II, the Duke of Edinburgh, Charles, Prince of Wales, and Princess Anne
- 18–29 April 1971: Princess Alexandra and Angus Ogilvy
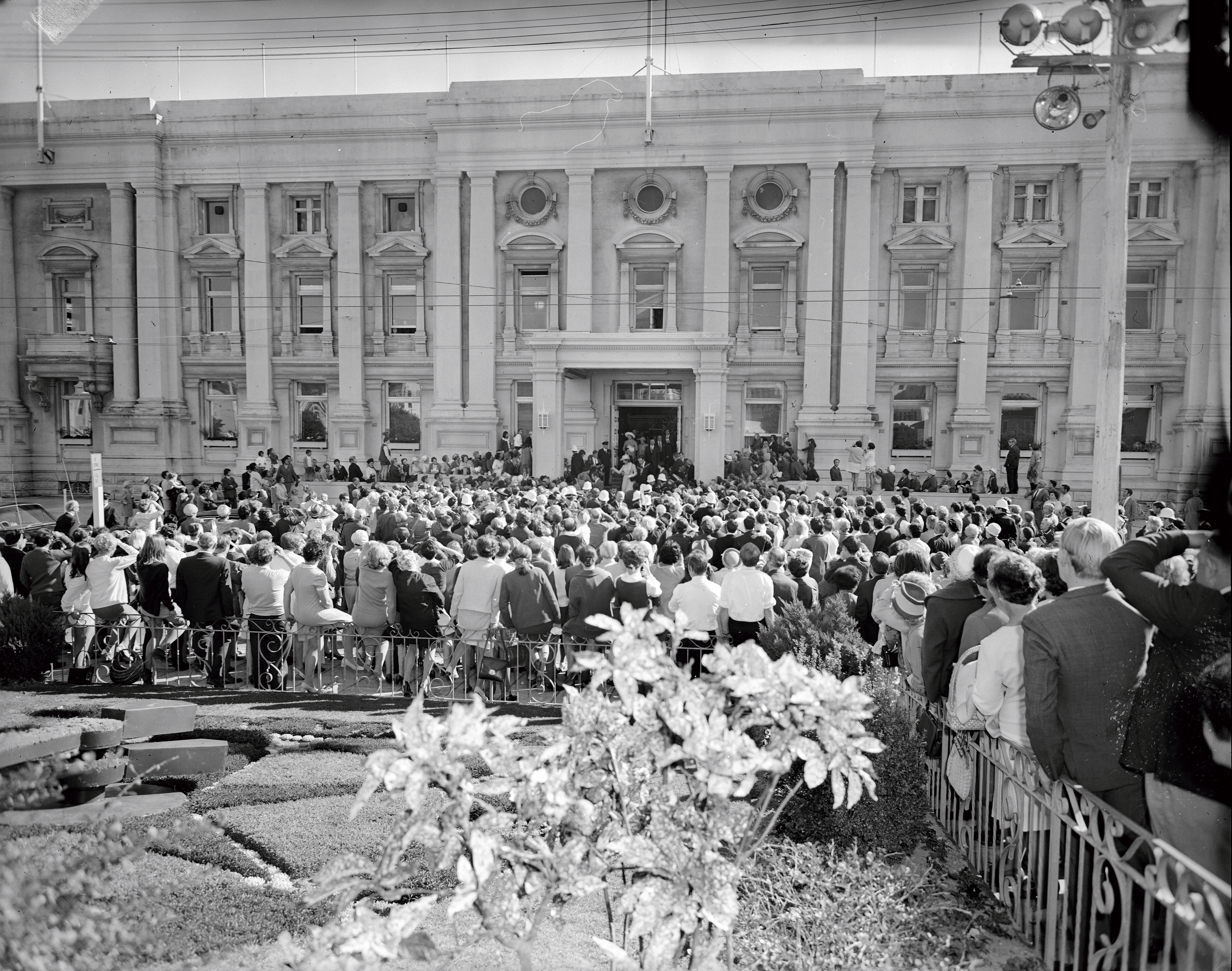
  Princess Alexandra on the steps of the Wellington Town Hall on 29 April 1971
- 10–14 October 1973: Duke of Edinburgh
- 1974
  - 22 January – 6 February: Elizabeth II, the Duke of Edinburgh, Charles, Prince of Wales, and Princess Anne
  - 4–5 September: Charles, Prince of Wales
- 22 February – 7 March 1977: Elizabeth II and the Duke of Edinburgh
- 1980: The Duke and Duchess of Kent
- 1981
  - 31 March – 12 April: Charles, Prince of Wales
  - 12–20 October: Elizabeth II and the Duke of Edinburgh
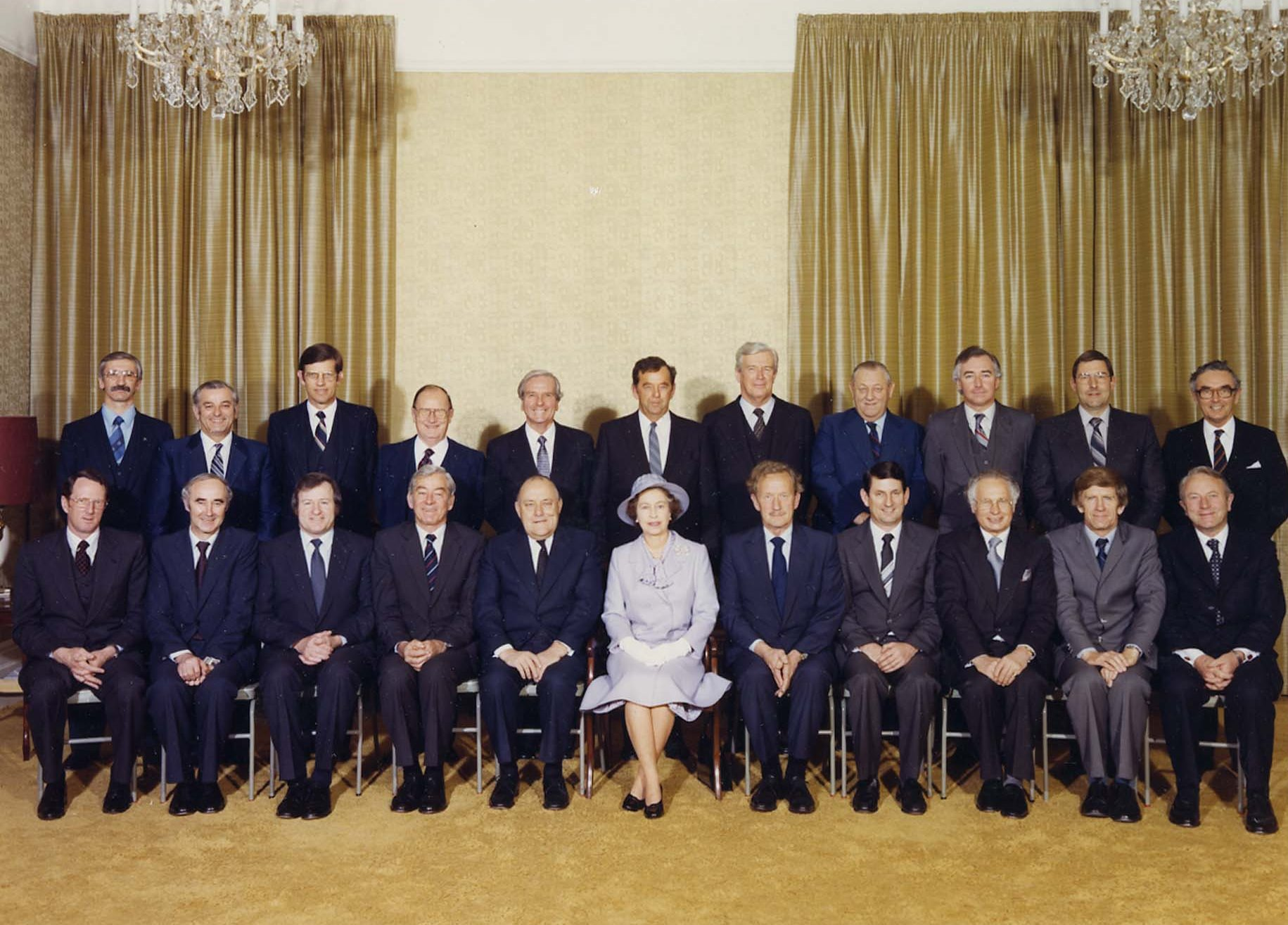
    The Queen with the Cabinet during her visit to New Zealand in 1981
- 1982–1983: Prince Edward
- 1983
  - 17–30 April: The Prince and Princess of Wales, Prince William
  - Prince Edward
- 1985: The Duke and Duchess of Gloucester
- 1986
  - 22 February – 2 March: Elizabeth II and the Duke of Edinburgh
  - Prince Edward
- 1990: Elizabeth II, the Duke of Edinburgh, and Prince Edward
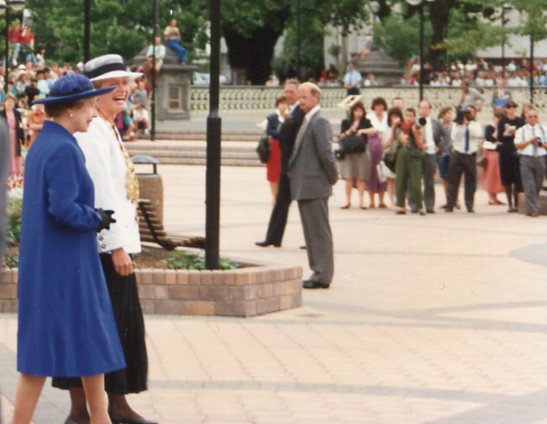
  The Queen and the mayor of Christchurch, Vicki Buck, during a walkabout in Victoria Square, Christchurch, in February 1990
- 5–10 February 1994: Charles, Prince of Wales
- 1995
  - 1–10 November: Elizabeth II and the Duke of Edinburgh
  - Anne, Princess Royal
- 1997: Duke of Edinburgh and Prince Edward
- 1998: Prince Andrew, Duke of York
- 1999: Anne, Princess Royal
- 2002
  - Anne, Princess Royal
  - 22–27 February: Elizabeth II and the Duke of Edinburgh
- 2003: Anne, Princess Royal
- 2004: Prince Edward, Earl of Wessex
- 2005
  - 5–10 March: Charles, Prince of Wales
  - 30 June – 10 July: Prince William
  - 29 September – 2 October: Prince Andrew, Duke of Yorkl
- 9–12 July 2006: Anne, Princess Royal
- 2007: Prince Andrew, Duke of York
- 2008: Anne, Princess Royal
- 2009: Prince Edward, Earl of Wessex
- 2010
  - Prince William
  - Prince Richard, Duke of Gloucester
- 2011: Prince William
- 10–16 November 2012: Charles, Prince of Wales and the Duchess of Cornwall
- 2014: The Duke and Duchess of Cambridge, Prince George
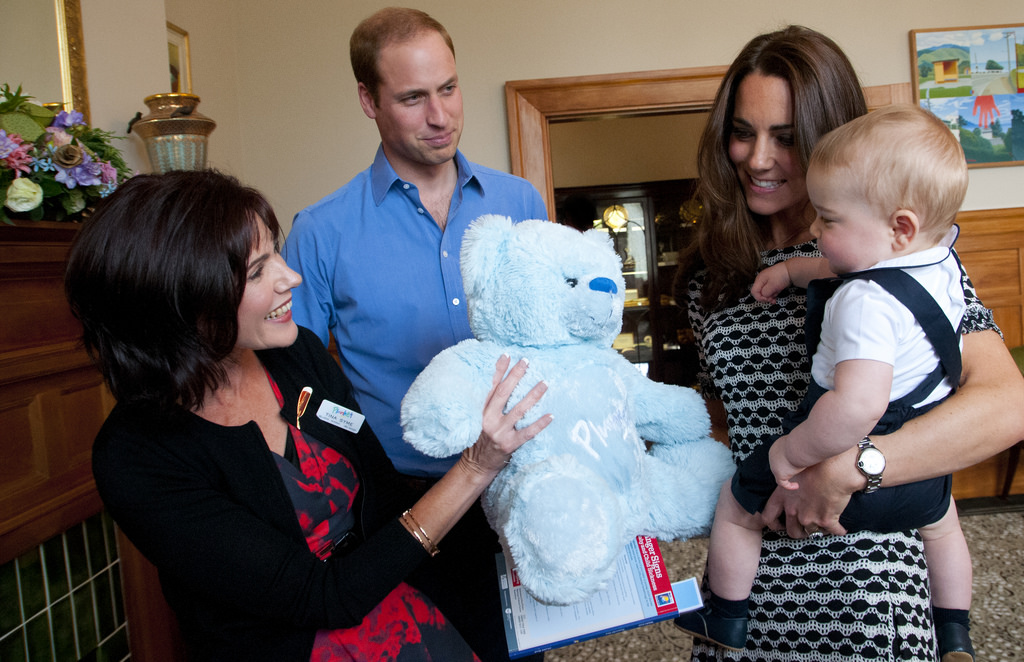
  Prince George is presented with a Plunket bear during a Plunket group at Government House, Wellington, in 2014, while the Duke and Duchess of Cambridge look on
- 2015
  - 9–16 May: Prince Harry
  - 4–9 November: Charles, Prince of Wales and the Duchess of Cornwall
- 2018: The Duke and Duchess of Sussex
- 2019
  - Prince William, Duke of Cambridge
  - 17–23 November: Charles, Prince of Wales and the Duchess of Cornwall

== Charles III's reign ==
- 2023
  - 15–18 February: Anne, Princess Royal and Vice Admiral Sir Timothy Laurence
  - 16–20 November: Prince Edward, Duke of Edinburgh

== Attack on Royalty ==
When Queen Elizabeth II was outside the Otago Museum in Dunedin during her 1981 visit, she was shot at by Christopher John Lewis while he was hiding in a room upstairs. He missed and he was later arrested.

== See also ==
- List of official overseas trips made by George V
- List of official overseas trips made by Edward VIII
- List of official overseas trips made by George VI
- List of Commonwealth visits made by Elizabeth II
