= List of state visits received by Elizabeth II =

After acceding to the thrones of the United Kingdom and other Commonwealth realms in February 1952, Queen Elizabeth II received a total of 113 state visits. She usually hosted one or two visiting heads of state each year. A state visit normally lasted for four days, including a state banquet given by the Queen at one of the royal residences as well as a formal reception of the City of London at Guildhall. (Note: According to the palace, any visit that did not include a state banquet given by the Queen was not considered a state visit (e.g. the visits to the United Kingdom of John F. Kennedy in June 1961, Carlos Andrés Pérez in November 1976, Carlos Menem in October 1998, Hugo Chávez in October 2001 and Abdelaziz Bouteflika in July 2006), except for the Papal visit in September 2010 which was specifically designated a state visit by the British government despite the missing of a state banquet. On his short visit in June 1982, Ronald Reagan was given a state banquet by the Queen at Windsor Castle, but this was still not considered a state visit due to the missing of other protocol such as the formal welcome in the City.)

== List of visits ==
No.	Date	Country	Regime	Guests	Venue for state banquet
1950s
1	28 June – 1 July 1954	Sweden	Monarchy	King Gustaf VI Adolf; Queen Louise	Buckingham Palace
2	14–16 October 1954	Ethiopia	Monarchy	Emperor Haile Salassie I	Buckingham Palace
3	25–28 October 1955	Portugal	Republic	President Francisco Craveiro Lopes; First Lady Berta Craveiro Lopes	Buckingham Palace
4	16–19 July 1956	Iraq	Monarchy	King Faisal II	Buckingham Palace
5	13–16 May 1958	Italy	Republic	President Giovanni Gronchi; Mme Carla Gronchi	Buckingham Palace
6	21–23 October 1958	West Germany	Republic	President Theodor Heuss	Buckingham Palace
7	5–8 May 1959	Iran	Monarchy	Shah Mohammad Reza Pahlavi	Buckingham Palace
1960s
8	5–8 April 1960	France	Republic	President Charles de Gaulle; Mme Yvonne de Gaulle	Buckingham Palace
9	19–21 July 1960	Thailand	Monarchy	King Bhumibol Adulyadej; Queen Sirikit	Buckingham Palace
10	17–20 October 1960	Nepal	Monarchy	King Mahendra; Queen Ratna	Buckingham Palace
11	10–13 July 1962	Liberia	Republic	President William Tubman; First Lady Antoinette Tubman	Buckingham Palace
12	16–19 October 1962	Norway	Monarchy	King Olav V	Holyrood Palace (Note: This was the first use of Holyrood Palace by the British monarch for state visits in modern times.)
13	14–17 May 1963	Belgium	Monarchy	King Baudouin I Queen Fabiola	Buckingham Palace
14	12–23 June 1963	India	Republic	President Sarvepalli Radhakrishnan	Buckingham Palace
15	9–12 July 1963	Greece	Monarchy	King Paul I Queen Frederika	Buckingham Palace
16	26 May – 4 June 1964	Sudan	Republic	President Ibrahim Abboud	Buckingham Palace
17	13–17 July 1965	Chile	Republic	President Eduardo Frei Montalva; First Lady María Ruiz-Tagle Jiménez	Buckingham Palace
18	17–21 May 1966	Austria	Republic	President Franz Jonas; First Lady Margarete Jonas	Buckingham Palace
19	19–28 July 1966	Jordan	Monarchy	King Hussein I Princess Muna al-Hussein	Buckingham Palace
20	17–25 November 1966	Pakistan	Republic	President Ayub Khan	Buckingham Palace
21	9–17 May 1967	Saudi Arabia	Monarchy	King Faisal	Buckingham Palace
22	1–8 November 1967	Turkey	Republic	President Cevdet Sunay; First Lady Atıfet Sunay	Buckingham Palace
23	22–30 April 1969	Italy	Republic	President Giuseppe Saragat; Mme Ernestina Santacatterina	Windsor Castle (Note: This was the first use of Windsor Castle for state visits since 1909.)
24	15–20 July 1969	Finland	Republic	President Urho Kekkonen; First Lady Sylvi Kekkonen	Buckingham Palace
1970s
25	5–8 October 1971	Japan	Monarchy	Emperor Hirohito (Note: He made an official visit to Britain as Crown Prince in May 1921 which was received by King George V.); Empress Nagako	Buckingham Palace
26	7–10 December 1971	Afghanistan	Monarchy	King Mohammed Zahir Shah	Buckingham Palace
27	11–15 April 1972	Netherlands	Monarchy	Queen Juliana (Note: Her second state visit to the United Kingdom. The first was received by King George VI in November 1950.); Prince Bernhard	Windsor Castle
28	13–16 June 1972	Luxembourg	Monarchy	Grand Duke Jean; Grand Duchess Joséphine Charlotte	Buckingham Palace
29	24–27 October 1972	West Germany	Republic	President Gustav Heinemann; Mme Hilda Heinemann	Windsor Castle
30	3–6 April 1973	Mexico	Republic	President Luis Echeverría; First Lady María Esther Zuno	Windsor Castle
31	12–15 June 1973	Nigeria	Republic	General Yakubu Gowon; First Lady Victoria Gowon	Buckingham Palace
32	11–14 December 1973	Zaire	Republic	President Mobutu Sese Seko; First Lady Marie-Antoinette Mobutu	Buckingham Palace
33	30 April – 3 May 1974	Denmark	Monarchy	Queen Margrethe II; Prince Henrik	Windsor Castle
34	9–12 July 1974	Malaysia	Monarchy	Yang di-Pertuan Agong Abdul Halim of Kedah; Raja Permaisuri Agong Tuanku Bahiyah	Buckingham Palace
35	8–11 July 1975	Sweden	Monarchy	King Carl XVI Gustaf	Holyrood Palace
36	18–21 November 1975	Tanzania	Republic	President Julius Nyerere	Buckingham Palace
37	4–7 May 1976	Brazil	Republic	President Ernesto Geisel; First Lady Lucy Geisel	Buckingham Palace
38	22–25 June 1976	France	Republic	President Valéry Giscard d'Estaing; Mme Anne-Aymone Giscard d'Estaing	Buckingham Palace
39	13–16 June 1978	Romania	Republic	President Nicolae Ceaușescu; First Lady Elena Ceaușescu	Buckingham Palace
40	14–17 November 1978	Portugal	Republic	President António Ramalho Eanes; First Lady Manuela Ramalho Eanes	Buckingham Palace
41	12–15 June 1979	Kenya	Republic	President Daniel arap Moi	Buckingham Palace
42	13–16 November 1979	Indonesia	Republic	President Suharto; First Lady Siti Hartinah	Buckingham Palace
1980s
43	18–21 November 1980	Nepal	Monarchy	King Birendra; Queen Aishwarya	Buckingham Palace
44	17–20 March 1981	Nigeria	Republic	President Shehu Shagari	Buckingham Palace
45	9–12 June 1981	Saudi Arabia	Monarchy	King Khalid	Buckingham Palace
46	16–19 March 1982	Oman	Monarchy	Sultan Qaboos bin Said	Buckingham Palace
47	16–19 November 1982	Netherlands	Monarchy	Queen Beatrix; Prince Claus	Buckingham Palace
48	22–25 March 1983	Zambia	Republic	President Kenneth Kaunda; First Lady Betty Kaunda	Buckingham Palace
49	10–13 April 1984	Bahrain	Monarchy	Emir Sheikh Isa bin Salman Al Khalifa	Windsor Castle
50	23–26 October 1984	France	Republic	President François Mitterrand; Mme Danielle Mitterrand	Buckingham Palace
51	16–19 April 1985	Malawi	Republic	President Hastings Banda	Windsor Castle
52	11–14 June 1985	Mexico	Republic	President Miguel de la Madrid; First Lady Paloma Cordero	Buckingham Palace
53	12–15 November 1985	Qatar	Monarchy	Emir Sheikh Khalifa bin Hamad Al Thani	Buckingham Palace
54	22–25 April 1986	Spain	Monarchy	King Juan Carlos I Queen Sofía	Windsor Castle
55	1–4 July 1986	West Germany	Republic	President Richard von Weizsäcker; Mme Marianne von Weizsäcker	Buckingham Palace
56	24–27 March 1987	Saudi Arabia	Monarchy	King Fahd	Buckingham Palace
57	14–17 July 1987	Morocco	Monarchy	King Hassan II	Buckingham Palace
58	12–15 April 1988	Norway	Monarchy	King Olav V (Note: His second state visit to the United Kingdom during the Queen's reign.)	Windsor Castle
59	12–15 July 1988	Turkey	Republic	President Kenan Evren	Buckingham Palace
60	8–11 November 1988	Senegal	Republic	President Abdou Diouf; First Lady Elizabeth Diouf	Buckingham Palace
61	9–12 May 1989	Nigeria	Republic	President Ibrahim Babangida; First Lady Maryam Babangida	Buckingham Palace
62	18–21 July 1989	United Arab Emirates	Monarchy	Sheikh Zayed bin Sultan Al Nahyan	Buckingham Palace
1990s
63	3–6 April 1990	India	Republic	President R. Venkataraman; First Lady Janaki Venkataraman	Buckingham Palace
64	23–26 October 1990	Italy	Republic	President Francesco Cossiga	Buckingham Palace
65	23–26 April 1991	Poland	Republic	President Lech Wałęsa; First Lady Danuta Wałęsa	Windsor Castle
66	23–26 July 1991	Egypt	Republic	President Hosni Mubarak; First Lady Suzanne Mubarak	Buckingham Palace
67	3–6 November 1992	Brunei	Monarchy	Sultan Hassanal Bolkiah; Queen Saleha	Buckingham Palace
68	27–30 April 1993	Portugal	Republic	President Mário Soares; First Lady Maria Barroso	Buckingham Palace
69	9–12 November 1993	Malaysia	Monarchy	Yang di-Pertuan Agong Azlan Shah of Perak; Raja Permaisuri Agong Tuanku Bainun	Buckingham Palace
70	17–20 May 1994	Zimbabwe	Republic	President Robert Mugabe	Buckingham Palace
71	5–8 July 1994	Norway	Monarchy	King Harald V Queen Sonja	Holyrood Palace
72	23–26 May 1995	Kuwait	Monarchy	Emir Sheikh Jaber Al-Ahmad Al-Sabah	Buckingham Palace
73	17–20 October 1995	Finland	Republic	President Martti Ahtisaari; First Lady Eeva Ahtisaari	Buckingham Palace
74	14–17 May 1996	France	Republic	President Jacques Chirac; Mme Bernadette Chirac	Buckingham Palace
75	9–12 July 1996	South Africa	Republic	President Nelson Mandela	Buckingham Palace
76	25–28 February 1997	Israel	Republic	President Ezer Weizman; Mme Reuma Weizman	Buckingham Palace
77	2–5 December 1997	Brazil	Republic	President Fernando Henrique Cardoso; First Lady Ruth Cardoso	Buckingham Palace
78	26–29 May 1998	Japan	Monarchy	Emperor Akihito; Empress Michiko	Buckingham Palace
79	1–4 December 1998	Germany	Republic	President Roman Herzog; Mme Christiane Herzog	Windsor Castle
80	22–25 June 1999	Hungary	Republic	President Árpád Göncz; First Lady Zsuzsanna Göncz	Windsor Castle
81	19–22 October 1999	China	Republic	President and CCP General Secretary Jiang Zemin; Mme Wang Yeping	Buckingham Palace
2000s
82	16–18 February 2000	Denmark	Monarchy	Queen Margrethe II (Note: Her second state visit to the United Kingdom during the Queen's reign.); Prince Henrik	Windsor Castle
83	12–15 June 2001	South Africa	Republic	President Thabo Mbeki; First Lady Zanele Dlamini Mbeki	Windsor Castle
84	6–9 November 2001	Jordan	Monarchy	King Abdullah II; Queen Rania	Windsor Castle
85	24–27 June 2003	Russia	Republic	President Vladimir Putin; First Lady Lyudmila Putina	Buckingham Palace
86	18–21 November 2003	United States	Republic	President George W. Bush; First Lady Laura Bush	Buckingham Palace
87	5–7 May 2004	Poland	Republic	President Aleksander Kwaśniewski; First Lady Jolanta Kwaśniewska	Buckingham Palace
88	1–3 December 2004	South Korea	Republic	President Roh Moo-hyun; First Lady Kwon Yang-sook	Buckingham Palace
89	15–18 March 2005	Italy	Republic	President Carlo Ciampi; Mme Franca Ciampi	Buckingham Palace
90	8–10 November 2005	China	Republic	President and CCP General Secretary Hu Jintao; Mme Liu Yongqing	Buckingham Palace
91	7–9 March 2006	Brazil	Republic	President Luiz Inácio Lula da Silva; First Lady Marisa Letícia Lula da Silva	Buckingham Palace
92	13–15 March 2007	Ghana	Republic	President John Kufuor; First Lady Theresa Kufuor	Buckingham Palace
93	30 October – 1 November 2007	Saudi Arabia	Monarchy	King Abdullah	Buckingham Palace
94	26–27 March 2008	France	Republic	President Nicolas Sarkozy; Mme Carla Bruni	Windsor Castle
95	30 March – 2 April 2009	Mexico	Republic	President Felipe Calderón; First Lady Margarita Zavala	Buckingham Palace
96	27–29 October 2009	India	Republic	President Pratibha Patil; First Gentleman Devisingh Ransingh Shekhawat	Windsor Castle
2010s
97	3–5 March 2010	South Africa	Republic	President Jacob Zuma; First Lady Thobeka Mabhija Zuma	Buckingham Palace
98	16–19 September 2010	Holy See	Monarchy	Pope Benedict XVI (Note: The first state visit of a pope to the United Kingdom. The Pope performs diplomatic functions not in the name of Vatican City, but that of the Holy see.)	— (Note: Although no state banquet was held, this visit was specifically designated a state visit by the British government. The Queen hosted the Pope at Holyrood Palace.)
99	26–28 October 2010	Qatar	Monarchy	Emir Sheikh Hamad bin Khalifa Al Thani; Sheikha Moza bint Nasser	Windsor Castle
100	24–26 May 2011	United States	Republic	President Barack Obama; First Lady Michelle Obama	Buckingham Palace
101	22–24 November 2011	Turkey	Republic	President Abdullah Gül; First Lady Hayrünnisa Gül	Buckingham Palace
102	31 October – 2 November 2012	Indonesia	Republic	President Susilo Bambang Yudhoyono; First Lady Kristiani Herrawati	Buckingham Palace
103	27–29 November 2012	Kuwait	Monarchy	Emir Sheikh Sabah Al-Ahmad Al-Jaber Al-Sabah	Windsor Castle
104	30 April – 1 May 2013	United Arab Emirates	Monarchy	Sheikh Khalifa bin Zayed Al Nahyan	Windsor Castle (Note: A state luncheon was held instead of a state dinner.)
105	5–7 November 2013	South Korea	Republic	President Park Geun-hye	Buckingham Palace
106	8–11 April 2014	Ireland	Republic	President Michael D. Higgins; Mrs Sabina Higgins	Windsor Castle
107	21–24 October 2014	Singapore	Republic	President Tony Tan; First Lady Mary Tan	Buckingham Palace
108	3–5 March 2015	Mexico	Republic	President Enrique Peña Nieto; First Lady Angélica Rivera	Buckingham Palace
109	20–23 October 2015	China	Republic	President and CCP General Secretary Xi Jinping; Mme Peng Liyuan	Buckingham Palace
110	1–3 November 2016	Colombia	Republic	President Juan Manuel Santos; First Lady María Clemencia Rodríguez	Buckingham Palace
111	12–14 July 2017	Spain	Monarchy	King Felipe VI; Queen Letizia	Buckingham Palace
112	23–24 October 2018	Netherlands	Monarchy	King Willem-Alexander; Queen Máxima	Buckingham Palace
113	3–5 June 2019	United States	Republic	President Donald Trump; First Lady Melania Trump	Buckingham Palace

== Countries that made state visits ==
Countries	State visits	Notes
Afghanistan	1	Monarchy abolished in 1973.
Austria	1	
Bahrain	1	
Belgium	1	
Brazil	3	
Brunei	1	
Chile	1	
China	3	
Colombia	1	
Denmark	2	
Egypt	1	
Ethiopia	1	Monarchy abolished in 1975.
Finland	2	
France	5	
Germany	4	3 visits for West Germany and 1 for the reunited Germany.
Ghana	1	
Greece	1	Monarchy abolished in 1973.
Holy See	1	
Hungary	1	
India	3	
Indonesia	2	
Iran	1	Monarchy abolished in 1979.
Iraq	1	Monarchy abolished in 1958.
Ireland	1	
Israel	1	
Italy	4	
Japan	2	
Jordan	2	
Kenya	1	
Kuwait	2	
Liberia	1	
Luxembourg	1	
Malawi	1	
Malaysia	2	
Mexico	4	
Morocco	1	
Nepal	2	Monarchy abolished in 2008.
Netherlands	3	
Nigeria	3	
Norway	3	
Oman	1	
Pakistan	1	
Poland	2	
Portugal	3	
Qatar	2	
Romania	1	
Russia	1	
Saudi Arabia	4	
Senegal	1	
Singapore	1	
South Africa	3	
South Korea	2	
Spain	2	
Sudan	1	
Sweden	2	
Tanzania	1	
Thailand	1	
Turkey	3	
United Arab Emirates	2	
United States	3	
Zaire	1	Now called Democratic Republic of the Congo.
Zambia	1	
Zimbabwe	1	

== See also ==
- List of state visits made by Elizabeth II
- List of Commonwealth official trips made by Elizabeth II
- List of state visits received by George VI
- List of state visits received by Charles III
