= State visit by Elizabeth II to Spain =

1988 visit by the British monarch

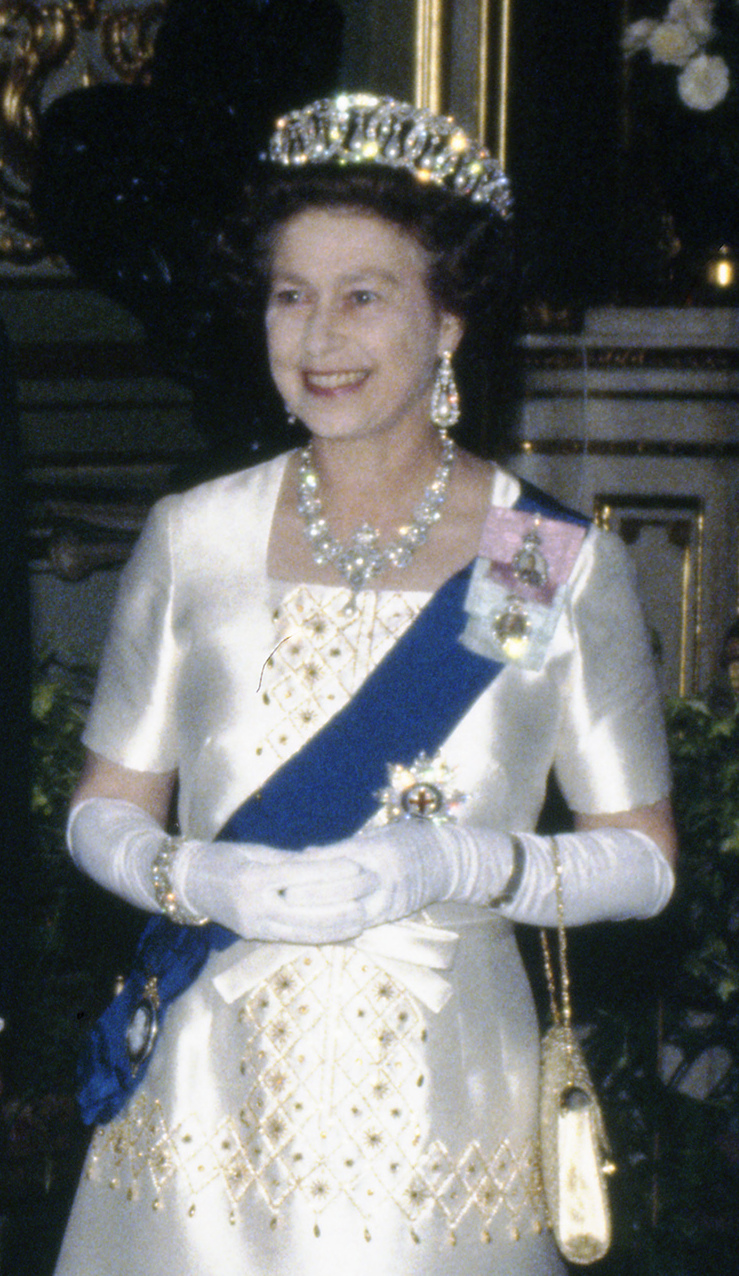
Elizabeth II

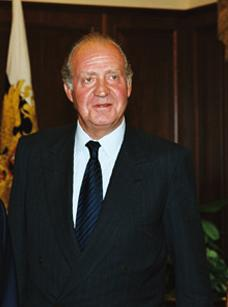
Juan Carlos I

Queen Elizabeth II of the United Kingdom of Great Britain and Northern Ireland made a state visit to the Kingdom of Spain from 17 to 21 October 1988. It was the first official visit by a British monarch to Spain, (Note: Queen Victoria visited Spain unofficially for less than a day in 1889. King Edward VII's 3-day state visit to Spain in 1907 was a naval visit only. The king did not step ashore.) and came two years after King Juan Carlos I made the first official visit by a Spanish monarch in 80 years to the United Kingdom. It was the Queen's only official visit to Spain; relations between the two kingdoms had been troubled by the status of Gibraltar.

Arriving in Madrid, the Queen visited the city and the nearby royal residence of El Escorial, as well as Seville and Barcelona. At the end of formal events, the two monarchs and their consorts sailed to Mallorca to spend three days on the island.

Paul Delaney of The New York Times wrote that "The visit has captured the attention of this nation, whose relations with Britain have been marred by hostility and distrust since the British defeat of the Spanish Armada 400 years ago".

== Background ==
The visit came in the early years of the Spanish transition to democracy following the death of Francisco Franco in 1975 and the 1981 Spanish coup d'état attempt. Spain had joined NATO and the European Economic Community in 1982; the UK was already a member of both. In April 1986, Juan Carlos I made the first Spanish state visit to the UK since 1905.

A month before the royal visit, Margaret Thatcher became the first prime minister of the United Kingdom to visit Spain. Juan Carlos I refused to attend the wedding of Prince Charles and Lady Diana Spencer in 1981 as the honeymoon was set to be in Gibraltar; he later grew closer to the British heir and holidayed with him in Mallorca.

Elizabeth II and Juan Carlos I were third-cousins, sharing Queen Victoria as a great-great-grandmother. Their respective consorts Prince Philip, Duke of Edinburgh and Queen Sofía, were members of the Greek royal family.

== Events ==
On 17 October 1988, Elizabeth II arrived at Madrid-Barajas airport as the first British monarch to make an official visit to Spain; her ancestors Queen Victoria (1889) and King Edward VII (1906) had visited unofficially.

At the Palacio de las Cortes in Madrid, the Queen was shown bullet holes from the 1981 coup attempt. During a dinner, she referred to Gibraltar as "the one remaining problem" in the bilateral relations.

The prime minister of Spain, Felipe González, hosted a lunch at his official residence, the Palace of Moncloa, on 18 October. Juan Mari Arzak, a specialist in New Basque cuisine from San Sebastián, prepared the meal. The British royal party requested as protocol not to be served garlic, due to its effects on the breath and on the stomach; Arzak modified his hake recipe and other dishes, which later formed part of a "Reina de Inglaterra" (Queen of England) menu at his own restaurant.

On 19 October, at El Escorial, Elizabeth II turned down the opportunity to enter the Pantheon of Kings, without giving a reason. Santiago Castelo of the conservative newspaper ABC wondered if this was due to the presence in the crypt of Philip II of Spain, the king who sent the Spanish Armada and who was viewed unfavourably in English popular memory. On the same day, she received the Gold Medal of the Complutense University of Madrid after giving a pro-European speech in which she also mentioned the importance of Spanish-British relations.

The Queen later went to Seville, where at the Alcázar, chef Rafael Juliá served Andalusian cuisine to Elizabeth II; the gazpacho had to be made without garlic or cucumber. It had been planned for duck from the marshlands of the Guadalquivir to be served, but the Queen had already eaten duck at El Escorial and partridge was known to be on the menu for her trip to Barcelona, so pheasant was prepared. The meal was served on Limoges porcelain acquired by Seville City Council for the Ibero-American Exposition of 1929 and decorated with the city's coat of arms.

The British and Spanish royal couples arrived in Barcelona on 20 October, where they met with the President of the Government of Catalonia Jordi Pujol and the Mayor of Barcelona Pasqual Maragall. They visited the Museu Picasso and the Estadi Olimpic de Montjuic, where Elizabeth II received 1992 Summer Olympics merchandise featuring the mascot Cobi for her grandchildren. She then opened a building at Kensington School, a British school established in the city in 1966. They then headed for Mallorca on the royal yacht Britannia.

At the end of formal events, the two royal couples arrived in Palma de Mallorca on 22 October, where "GIBRALTAR ESPAÑOL" was written in graffiti on the harbour. After three days, the British royal couple departed, being waved off by their Spanish counterparts, the President of the Balearic Islands Gabriel Cañellas and Nicolás Cotoner, 23rd Marquess of Mondéjar.
