= List of official overseas trips made by Edward VII =

King Edward VII succeeded to the throne of the United Kingdom in January 1901. Before his accession, he made extensive tours of territories of the British Empire or under British control as the Prince of Wales. His visit to Canada was regarded as the first modern official visit to overseas territories by a member of the royal family, and his visit to India was the first to the country by a future British monarch. As King, he revived state visit to foreign countries as an important tool of diplomatic maneuver and royal influence, playing a significant role in establishing the modern form of state visit of the British monarchs. Among his many visits to European countries were the first state visit by a reigning British monarch to a republic (France) and the first to Russia as well as some less formal ones that were not counted as full state visits (e.g. his visit to Austria in August – September 1903). He did not make official tours of British territories outside Europe as King.

== Official tours of territories of the British Empire or under British control as Prince of Wales ==
Tour of North America from July to October 1860: (Note: The Prince paid an unofficial visit to the United States over 20 September – 20 October. The voyages were on board HMS Hero.)
Date	Territory	Areas visited	Host
24–26 July 1860	Newfoundland	St John's	Governor Sir Alexander Bannerman
30 July – 2 August, 8 August, 1860	Nova Scotia	Halifax, Windsor, Truro	Lieutenant Governor Lord Mulgrave
3–7 August 1860	New Brunswick	Saint John, Fredericton	Lieutenant Governor Sir John Manners-Sutton
9–11 August 1860	Prince Edward Island	Charlottetown	Governor George Dundas
18 August – 20 September 1860	Province of Canada	Quebec City, Montreal, Saint-Hyacinthe, Sherbrooke, Ottawa, Cobourg, Port Hope, Toronto, Collingwood, Guelph, London, Sarnia, Niagara Falls, St. Catharines, Hamilton	Governor General Sir Edmund Head
Tour of Eastern Mediterranean from February to June 1862: (Note: The Prince also paid unofficial visit to the United States of the Ionian Islands in February. The voyages were on board HMY Osborne.)
Date	Territory	Areas visited	Host
5–7 June 1862	Malta	Valletta	Governor Sir John Le Marchant
Tour of India and other overseas territories from November 1875 to April 1876: (Note: The Prince visited Portuguese Goa on 27 November, French Chandernagore on 26 December and took part in a hunting trip in Nepal arranged by the Prime Minister over 20 February – 5 March. The voyages were on board HMS Serapis.)
Date	Territory	Areas visited	Host
1 November 1875	Aden Settlement (Note: A territory under the administration of the British Raj.)	Aden	Resident John William Schneider
8–29 November 1875, 10 December 1875 – 20 February 1876, 5–13 March 1876	India	Bombay Presidency (Bombay, Poona), Madras Presidency (Tuticorin, Madura, Trichinopoly, Madras), Bengal Presidency (Calcutta, Barrackpore, Bankipur), North Western Provinces and Oudh (Faizabad, Lucknow, Cawnpore, Agra, Moradabad, Nainital, Pilibhit, Bareilly, Allahabad), Punjab Province (Delhi, Lahore, Wazirabad, Sialkot, Amritsar), Central Provinces (Jabalpur), 9 Princely states (see below)	Viceroy Lord Northbrook; Governor Sir Philip Wodehouse; Governor Duke of Buckingham
19–23 November 1875	Baroda (Note: A princely state of the British Raj.)	Baroda	Maharaja Sayajirao Gaekwad III
1–8 December 1875	Ceylon	Colombo, Kandy, Ruanwalla	Governor Sir William Henry Gregory
4–6 January 1876	Benares	Benares	Maharaja Ishwari Prasad Narayan Singh
20–22 January 1876	Jammu and Kashmir	Jammu	Maharaja Ranbir Singh
24–25 January 1876 (Note: A short visit by the Prince en route to Agra.)	Patiala	Rajpura	Maharaja Mahendra Singh
31 January, 2 February, 1876 (Note: Two short visits by the Prince en route to and from Gwalior.)	Dholpur	Dholpur	Maharaja Rana Nihal Singh
31 January – 2 February 1876	Gwalior	Gwalior	Maharaja Jayajirao Scindia
4 February 1876 (Note: A short visit by the Prince en route to Jaipur.)	Bharatpur	Bharatpur	Maharaja Jaswant Singh
4–7 February 1876	Jaipur	Jaipur	Maharaja Ram Singh II
9–10 March 1876	Indore	Indore	Maharaja Tukojirao Holkar II
6–11 April 1876	Malta	Valletta	Governor Sir Charles van Straubenzee
16–20 April 1876	Gibraltar		Acting Governor Edward Arthur Somerset

== State visits as King ==
Date	Country	Areas visited	Host
27–30 April 1903 (Note: Queen Alexandra did not accompany The King on this visit. The King paid a private visit to Pope Leo XIII in Vatican on 29 April which made him the first reigning British monarch to meet the Pope since the English Reformation.)	Italy	Rome	King Victor Emmanuel III
1–4 May 1903 (Note: Queen Alexandra did not accompany The King on this visit.)	France	Paris, Vincennes	President Émile Loubet
8–10 April 1907 (Note: This was arranged as a "naval visit" in the sense that The King arrived at the harbour onboard the Royal Yacht Victoria and Albert with a fleet of the Royal Navy and did not land on Spanish soil. The state banquet hosted by the King of Spain was held aboard the Spanish armoured frigate Numancia.)	Spain	Cartagena	King Alfonso XIII
21–25 April 1908	Denmark	Copenhagen	King Frederick VIII
26–27 April 1908	Sweden	Stockholm	King Gustaf V
28 April – 2 May 1908	Norway	Christiania	King Haakon VII
9–11 June 1908 (Note: This was arranged as a "naval visit" in the sense that The King arrived at the harbour onboard the Royal Yacht Victoria and Albert with a fleet of the Royal Navy and did not land on Russian soil. The state banquet hosted by the Emperor of Russia was held onboard the Russian Imperial Yacht Standart.)	Russia	Reval	Emperor Nicholas II
9–12 February 1909	Germany	Berlin	Emperor Wilhelm II

== Official tours of territories of the British Empire as King ==
Date	Territory	Areas visited	Host
8–13 April 1903	Gibraltar		Governor Sir George White
16–21 April 1903	Malta	Valletta	Governor Sir Charles Clarke
13–17 April 1907	Malta	Valletta, Attard	Governor Sir Charles Clarke
21–25 April 1909	Malta	Valletta, Attard	Governor Sir Henry Grant

== See also ==
- List of state visits received by Edward VII
- List of foreign visits made by Queen Victoria, his predecessor
- List of official overseas trips made by George V, his successor
