= List of state visits received by George VI =

King George VI acceded to the throne of the United Kingdom in December 1936. Due to the outbreak of World War II and his poor health in post-War years, he only received a few state visits from foreign heads of state during his reign, all of whom were from European countries. A state visit normally lasted for 4 days and included a state banquet given by The King at Buckingham Palace as well as a formal reception of the City of London at Guildhall.

== List of visits ==
No.	Date	Country	Regime	Guests	Venue for State Banquet
1	16–19 November 1937	Belgium	Monarchy	King Leopold III	Buckingham Palace
2	15–18 November 1938	Romania	Monarchy	King Carol II; Crown Prince Michael	Buckingham Palace
3	21–24 March 1939	France	Republic	President Albert Lebrun; Mme Marguerite Lebrun	Buckingham Palace
4	7–10 March 1950	France	Republic	President Vincent Auriol; Mme Michelle Auriol	Buckingham Palace
5	21–24 November 1950	Netherlands	Monarchy	Queen Juliana; Prince Bernhard	Buckingham Palace
6	8–11 May 1951	Denmark	Monarchy	King Frederik IX; Queen Ingrid	Buckingham Palace
7	5–8 June 1951 (Note: King George VI was ill and unable to appear in public. Instead, Queen Elizabeth and the Duke of Gloucester greeted the King of Norway at the welcome ceremony, while Princess Elizabeth gave the speech on behalf of her father at the state banquet. This visit did not include a formal reception of the City of London at Guildhall.)	Norway	Monarchy	King Haakon VII (Note: His second state visit to the United Kingdom. The first was received by King Edward VII in November 1906.)	Buckingham Palace

== See also ==
- List of official overseas trips made by George VI
- List of state visits received by George V
- List of state visits received by Elizabeth II
