= Nuno Craveiro Lopes =

Portuguese architect (1921–1972)

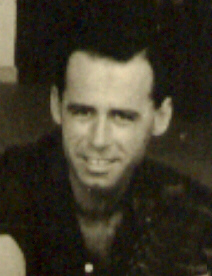
Nuno Craveiro Lopes in Lisbon, 1947

Nuno Craveiro Lopes (1921–1972) was a Portuguese architect whose work includes projects in Mozambique and Angola from the colonial period. He was the son of Francisco Higino Craveiro Lopes, President of the Portuguese Republic, and Berta da Costa Ribeiro Artur. He married Albertina da Silveira Pinto of Rance and they had three children.

== Biography ==
Lopes was born in 1921 in Lisbon. He did military service in the Military Aviation School in Sintra. He became an ensign in 1941. He studied architecture at the Lisbon School of Fine Arts (1945). He part of the Committee of the School of Youth MUD EBAL with Francisco Castro Rodrigues, José Dias Coelho, João Abel Manta, Lima de Freitas, Alfredo Antonio, M. Emily Cabrita, Jorge Vieira, Bartolomeu Cid dos Santos, Croft de Moura, Sena da Silva, Arnaldo de Almeida Louro, Daisy Tengarrinha, Cecilia Ferreira Alves, Tomás de Figueiredo, Hestnes Raul Ferreira, and Augusto Sobral.

In the military he collaborated in the construction of the Campo de Santa Margarida. He also did some residential work.

He was posted to Lourenço Marques as Chief of the Office of Public Works Urbanization of Mozambique in 1952. He did work on the Santo António da Polana church in Lourenço Marques (Maputo), Mozambique and the Cambambe dam in the Kwanza river, Angola. He died in Lourenço Marques of disease in 1972 at 51.

== Work ==
- Military Campo Santa Margherita
- Set buildings on Avenue Brazil, Lisbon,
- Cambambe dam, Angola
- Church of the Sacred Heart of Jesus Chibuto, Mozambique
- Church of Polana, Lourenço Marques, Mozambique
