= List of state visits received by Edward VII =

King Edward VII succeeded to the throne of the United Kingdom in January 1901. During his reign he received plenty of state visits from foreign heads of state, all of which were from European countries, including the first state visit to Britain by a President of the French Republic. The state banquets for the visiting heads of state were held at either Buckingham Palace or Windsor Castle. A state visit normally included formal reception of the City of London at Guildhall. The King also received many less formal visits from foreign heads of state to Britain, including a visit of Shah Mozaffar ad-Din of Persia to Portsmouth in August 1902 and one of Emperor Nicholas II of Russia to Cowes in August 1909.

== List of visits ==
| No. | Date | Country | Regime | Guests | Venue for State Banquet |
|---|---|---|---|---|---|
| 1 | 6–9 July 1903 | France | Republic | President Émile Loubet | Buckingham Palace (Note: This was the first use of Buckingham Palace for state visits in modern times.) |
| 2 | 17–21 November 1903 | Italy | Monarchy | King Victor Emmanuel III; Queen Elena | Windsor Castle |
| 3 | 15–21 November 1904 | Portugal | Monarchy | King Carlos I Queen Amélie | Windsor Castle |
| 4 | 5–10 June 1905 | Spain | Monarchy | King Alfonso XIII | Buckingham Palace |
| 5 | 13–20 November 1905 | Greece | Monarchy | King George I | Windsor Castle |
| 6 | 12–19 November 1906 | Norway | Monarchy | King Haakon VII; Queen Maud | Windsor Castle |
| 7 | 8–13 June 1907 | Denmark | Monarchy | King Frederick VIII; Queen Louise | Buckingham Palace |
| 8 | 11–18 November 1907 | Germany | Monarchy | Emperor Wilhelm II (Note: His second state visit to the United Kingdom. The first was received by Queen Victoria in July 1891.); Empress Augusta Victoria | Windsor Castle |
| 9 | 25–29 May 1908 | France | Republic | President Armand Fallières | Buckingham Palace |
| 10 | 16–21 November 1908 | Sweden | Monarchy | King Gustaf V Queen Victoria | Windsor Castle |
| 11 | 15–22 November 1909 | Portugal | Monarchy | King Manuel II | Windsor Castle (Note: This was the last use of Windsor Castle for state visits until 1969.) |

== See also ==
- List of official overseas trips made by Edward VII
- List of state visits received by Queen Victoria
- List of state visits received by George V
