= List of state visits received by Queen Victoria =

Queen Victoria succeeded to the throne of the United Kingdom in June 1837. It was during her long reign that the modern form of state visits began to take shape. A full state visit usually included a state banquet given by the Queen at Windsor Castle and a formal reception by the City of London at Guildhall. All foreign heads of state made official visits to the Queen were monarchs, either of European or Asian countries. The Queen also received many less formal visits from foreign heads of state to Britain, like one by Emperor Nicholas I of Russia in June 1844.

== List of visits ==
No.	Date	Country	Regime	Guests	Venue for State Banquet	Image
1	8–15 October 1844	France	Monarchy	King Louis Philippe I	Windsor Castle	
2	16–21 April 1855	France	Monarchy	Emperor Napoleon III; Empress Eugénie	Windsor Castle	
3	29 November – 6 December 1855	Sardinia	Monarchy	King Victor Emmanuel II	Windsor Castle	
4	12–23 July 1867	Ottoman Empire	Monarchy	Sultan Abdulaziz	Windsor Castle (Note: A state luncheon was held instead of a state dinner.)	
5	18 June – 5 July 1873	Persia	Monarchy	Shah Naser al-Din	Windsor Castle	
6	13–21 May 1874	Russia	Monarchy	Emperor Alexander II	Windsor Castle	
7	1–7 July 1889	Persia	Monarchy	Shah Naser al-Din (Note: His second state visit to the United Kingdom during The Queen's reign.)	Windsor Castle	
8	5–13 July 1891 (Note: The Emperor and Empress attended the wedding ceremony of Princess Marie Louise of Schleswig-Holstein and Prince Aribert of Anhalt during their visit.)	Germany	Monarchy	Emperor Wilhelm II; Empress Augusta Victoria	Windsor Castle	

== See also ==
- List of foreign visits made by Queen Victoria
- List of state visits received by Edward VII
