= List of state visits received by George V =

King George V acceded to the throne of the United Kingdom in May 1910. As World War I broke out shortly after his accession, most of the state visits of foreign heads of state he received were made after the end of the war. A state visit normally lasted for 3-5 days and included a state banquet given by The King at Buckingham Palace as well as a formal reception of the City of London at Guildhall.

== List of visits ==
No.	Date	Country	Regime	Guests	Venue for State Banquet
1	24–27 June 1913	France	Republic	President Raymond Poincaré	Buckingham Palace
2	31 October – 4 November 1919	Persia	Monarchy	Shah Ahmad Shah	Buckingham Palace
3	10–14 November 1919	France	Republic	President Raymond Poincaré (Note: His second state visit to the United Kingdom during the King's reign.); Mme Henriette Poincaré	Buckingham Palace
—	9–12 May 1921	Japan	Monarchy	Crown Prince Hirohito (Note: Although he was not a head of state, the status of his official visit to the United Kingdom was the same as of a state visit.)	Buckingham Palace
4	4–8 July 1921	Belgium	Monarchy	King Albert I Queen Elisabeth	Buckingham Palace
5	12–15 May 1924	Romania	Monarchy	King Ferdinand I Queen Marie	Buckingham Palace
6	26–29 May 1924	Italy	Monarchy	King Victor Emmanuel III (Note: His second state visit to the United Kingdom. The first was received by King Edward VII in November 1903.); Queen Elena	Buckingham Palace
7	16–19 May 1927	France	Republic	President Gaston Doumergue	Buckingham Palace
8	4–6 July 1927	Egypt	Monarchy	King Fuad I	Buckingham Palace
9	13–15 March 1928	Afghanistan	Monarchy	King Amanullah Khan; Queen Soraya Tarzi	Buckingham Palace
10	20–22 June 1933	Iraq	Monarchy	King Faisal I	Buckingham Palace

== See also ==
- List of official overseas trips made by George V
- List of state visits received by Edward VII
- List of state visits received by George VI
