= List of official overseas trips made by Edward VIII =

King Edward VIII succeeded to the thrones of the United Kingdom and the dominions in January and abdicated in December 1936. As Prince of Wales (1910–1936), he made extensive official tours of dominions and territories of the British Empire, but he did not make any state visits or official tours of overseas territories as King during his short reign.

== Official tours of Dominions and territories of the British Empire as Prince of Wales ==
Tour of North America from August to November 1919: (Note: The Prince paid a visit to the United States over 10–21 November. The voyages were on board HMS Renown.)
Date	Country/Territory	Areas visited	Host
12–13 August 1919	Dominion of Newfoundland	St. John's	Governor Sir Charles Alexander Harris
14 August – 10 November, 24–25 November, 1919	Canada	New Brunswick (Saint John), Nova Scotia (Halifax), Prince Edward Island (Charlottetown), Quebec (Quebec City, Montreal), Ontario (Toronto, Ottawa, North Bay, Greater Sudbury, Sault Ste. Marie, Hamilton, Niagara Falls, Brantford, London, Windsor, Kingston), Manitoba (Winnipeg), Saskatchewan (Saskatoon, Regina), Alberta (Edmonton, Calgary, Banff, Lethbridge, Medicine Hat), British Columbia (Vancouver, Victoria)	Governor General Duke of Devonshire
Tour of Oceania and the West Indies from March to October 1920: (Note: The prince paid unofficial visits to Panama, the United States, Territory of Hawaii and Mexico en route. The voyages were on board HMS Renown.)
Date	Country/Territory	Areas visited	Host
26–27 March 1920	Barbados		Governor Sir Charles O'Brien
21–22 April, 23–24 August, 1920	Fiji	Suva	Governor Sir Cecil Hunter-Rodwell
24 April – 22 May 1920	New Zealand	Auckland, Rotorua, Napier, Hastings, Wellington, Nelson, Christchurch, Dunedin, Invercargill	Governor-General Lord Liverpool
26 May – 19 August 1920	Australia	Victoria (Melbourne), New South Wales (Sydney, Newcastle), Federal Capital Territory (Canberra), Western Australia (Perth), South Australia (Adelaide), Tasmania (Hobart, Launceston), Queensland (Brisbane, Toowoomba)	Governor-General Sir Ronald Ferguson; Governor Sir Walter Davidson; Governor Sir Francis Newdegate; Governor Sir Archibald Weigall; Governor Sir William Allardyce
27 August 1920	Territory of Western Samoa (Note: A former German colony under the occupation and administration of New Zealand.)	Apia	Administrator Robert Tate
17–20, 23–24, September; 1920	Trinidad and Tobago	Port of Spain	Governor Sir John Chancellor
21–22 September 1920	Guiana	Georgetown	Governor Sir Wilfred Collet
24–25 September 1920	Windward Islands	Grenada, Saint Lucia	Governor Sir George Haddon-Smith
26–28 September 1920	Leeward Islands	Dominica, Montserrat, Antigua	Governor Sir Edward Merewether
1–3 October 1920	Bermuda		Governor Sir James Willcocks
Tour of India and the Far East from October 1921 to June 1922: (Note: The Prince paid an unofficial visit to the Sultanate of Egypt over 5–6 November, took part in a hunting trip in Nepal arranged by the Prime Minister over 14–21 December, paid a visit to Japan over 12 April – 9 May, and paid unofficial visit to the Philippines over 13–15 May and to the Kingdom of Egypt over 9–12 June. The voyages were on board HMS Renown.)
Date	Country/Territory	Areas visited	Host
29 October 1921, 17 June 1922	Gibraltar		Governor Sir Horace Smith-Dorrien
1–3 November 1921	Malta	Valletta, Attard	Governor Lord Plumer
12 November 1921	Aden Settlement (Note: A territory under the administration of the British Raj.)	Aden	Resident Thomas Edwin Scott
17 November – 13 December 1921, 21 December 1921 – 17 March 1922	India	Bombay Presidency (Bombay, Poona, Mhow, Karachi), Ajmer-Merwara Province (Ajmer), United Provinces of Agra and Oudh (Lucknow, Allahabad, Agra, Dehradun, Gajraula), Bihar and Orissa Province (Patna), Bengal Presidency (Calcutta), Burma Province (Rangoon, Mandalay), Madras Presidency (Madras), Central Provinces and Berar (Nagpur), Delhi Province (Delhi), Punjab Province (Jullundur, Lahore, Sialkot, Jhelum, Taxila, Rawalpindi), North-West Frontier Province (Peshawar, Mardan), 14 Princely states (see below)	Viceroy Lord Reading; Governor Sir George Lloyd; Governor Sir Harcourt Butler; Acting Governor Havilland Le Mesurier; Governor Lord Ronaldshay; Governor Lord Willingdon; Governor Sir Frank Sly; Governor Sir Edward MacLagan
23–24 November 1921	Baroda (Note: A princely state of the British Raj.)	Baroda	Maharaja Sayajirao Gaekwad III
25–27 November 1921	Udaipur	Udaipur	Maharana Fateh Singh
29 November – 1 December 1921	Jodhpur	Jodhpur	Maharaja Umaid Singh; Regent Maharaja Pratap Singh
2–6 December 1921	Bikaner	Bikaner	Maharaja Ganga Singh
7–8 December 1921	Bharatpur	Bharatpur	Maharaja Kishan Singh
13 December 1921	Benares	Benares	Maharaja Prabhu Narayan Singh
18–23 January 1922	Mysore	Bangalore, Mysore	Maharaja Krishna Raja Wadiyar IV
25–28 January 1922	Hyderabad	Hyderabad	Nizam Mir Osman Ali Khan
1–3 February 1922	Indore	Indore	Maharaja Tukojirao Holkar III
4–7 February 1922	Bhopal	Bhopal	Begum Sultan Jahan
8–12 February 1922	Gwalior	Gwalior	Maharaja Madho Rao Scindia
22–24 February 1922	Patiala	Patiala	Maharaja Bhupinder Singh
2–3 March 1922	Jammu and Kashmir	Satwari	Maharaja Pratap Singh
13 March 1922	Kapurthala	Kapurthala	Maharaja Jagatjit Singh
21–25 March, 27–30 May, 1922	Ceylon	Colombo, Kandy, Trincomalee	Governor Sir William Manning
28–30 March 1922	Federated Malay States (Note: A federation of British protectorates.)	Port Swettenham, Kuala Lumpur	High Commissioner Sir Laurence Guillemard (Note: Also Governor of the Straits Settlements.); Sultan Sulaiman of Selangor
31 March – 1 April, 17 May, 23 May, 1922	Straits Settlements	Singapore, Labuan, Penang	Governor Sir Laurence Guillemard
6–8 April 1922	Hong Kong		Governor Sir Edward Stubbs
18 May 1922	North Borneo	Jesselton	Governor Aylmer Cavendish Pearson
19 May 1922	Brunei (Note: A British protectorate.)	Brunei Town	Sultan Muhammad Jamalul Alam II
Tour of West and Southern Africa from April to August 1925: (Note: The Prince paid visits to Brazil, Uruguay, Argentina and Chile over August–September. The voyages were on board HMS Repulse.)
Date	Country/Territory	Areas visited	Host
4 April 1925	Gambia	Barthurst	Governor Cecil Armitage
6–7 April 1925	Sierra Leone	Freetown	Governor Sir Ransford Slater
9–14 April 1925	Gold Coast	Sekondi, Coomassie, Accra	Governor Sir Gordon Guggisberg
16–22 April 1925	Nigeria	Iddo Island, Ilorin, Zaria, Kano, Ibadan, Lagos	Governor Sir Hugh Clifford
30 April – 28 May, 30 May – 14 June, 15–26 June, 20–29 July, 1925	Union of South Africa	Cape Province (Cape Town, Stellenbosch, Oudtshoorn, Port Elizabeth, Uitenhage, East London, Umtata, Kimberley, Simon's Town), Orange Free State (Bloemfontein, Harrismith), Natal (Ladysmith, Durban, Pietermaritzburg), Transvaal (Ermelo, Pietersburg, Pretoria, Johannesburg, Mafeking)	Governor-General Lord Athlone
28–30 May 1925	Basutoland	Maseru	Resident Commissioner Sir Edward Garraway; Chief Nathaniel Griffith Lerotholi
14–15 June	Swaziland	Mbabane	Resident Commissioner de Symons Honey; Chief Sobhuza II
27–28 June, 18–19 July, 1925	Bechuanaland	Palapye, Gaborone	Resident Commissioner Jules Ellenberger
29 June – 10 July, 16–17 July, 1925	Southern Rhodesia	Bulawayo, Matopos, Salisbury, Gatooma, Que Que	Governor Sir John Chancellor
11–15 July 1925	Northern Rhodesia	Livingstone, Kafue	Governor Sir Herbert Stanley
4–5 August 1925	Saint Helena		Governor Charles Harper
Tour of Canada from July to September 1927 to attend the Diamond Jubilee of Canadian Confederation:
Date	Country/Territory	Areas visited	Host
30 July – 7 September 1927	Canada	Quebec (Quebec City, Montreal), Ontario (Ottawa, Brockville, Kingston, Toronto, Niagara Falls), Alberta (Calgary, Edmonton, Banff), British Columbia (Vancouver, Victoria), Saskatchewan (Regina), Manitoba (Winnipeg)	Governor General Lord Willingdon
Tour of East Africa from September to December 1928: (Note: The Prince paid unofficial visits to Egypt, Anglo-Egyptian Sudan and Aden Settlement en route.)
Date	Country/Territory	Areas visited	Host
28 September – 14 October, 30 October – 15 November, 1928	Kenya	Mombasa, Nairobi, Kitale, Eldoret, Nakuru	Governor Sir Edward Grigg
15–29 October 1928	Uganda	Entebbe, Kampala, Fort Portal, Mukono Town, Lugazi, Jinja	Governor Sir William Gowers
15–30 November, 1–2 December, 1928	Tanganyika Territory (Note: A League of Nations mandate under the administration of the United Kingdom.)	Arusha, Babati, Dodoma, Dar es Salaam	Governor Sir Donald Cameron
30 November – 1 December 1928	Sultanate of Zanzibar		Sultan Khalifa bin Harub; Resident Sir Claud Hollis
Tour of South America from January to April 1931: (Note: The Prince paid paid visits to Cuba, Panama, Peru, Bolivia, Chile, Argentina, Uruguay and Brazil and paid unofficial visits to Bermuda and Portugal en route.)
Date	Country/Territory	Areas visited	Host
3–4 February 1931	Jamaica	Kingston	Governor Sir Edward Stubbs

== See also ==
- List of official overseas trips made by George V, his predecessor
- List of official overseas trips made by George VI, his successor
