= Royal Train (New Zealand) =

Special train carriages used for royal visits

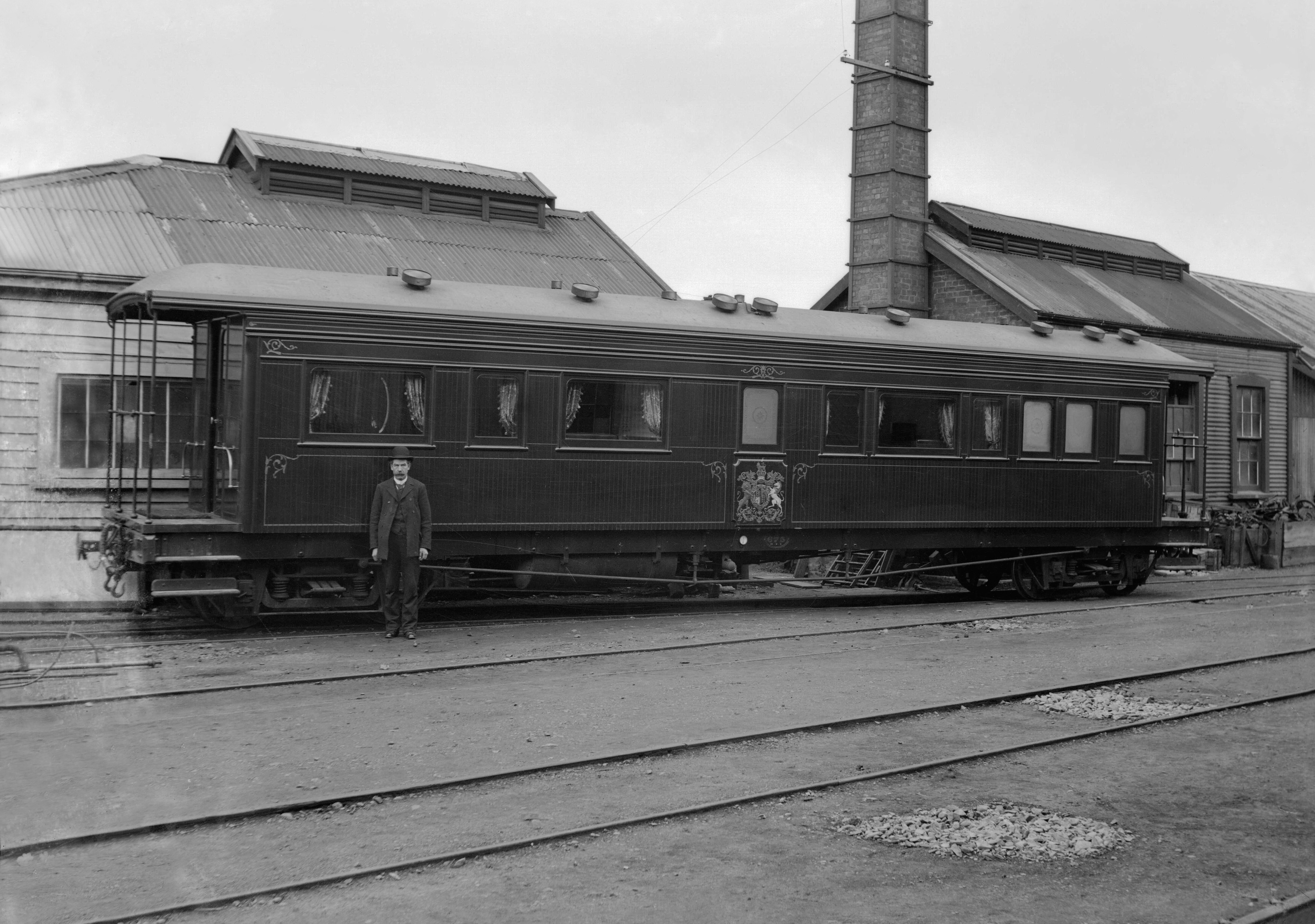
Exterior view of the Royal Train carriage, used during the Duke of Cornwall and York's 1901 visit

The Royal Trains were special train carriages used by New Zealand Railways during royal visits to New Zealand, which occurred in 1901, 1920, 1927, 1935 and 1954. Each Royal Train was preceded by a pilot train, a similar arrangement to that used in Britain.

== The Duke and Duchess of Cornwall, 1901 ==
The train was built and used for the visit of Prince George Frederick Ernest Albert (George V) (1865–1936) and his Duchess, who travelled on 25 June 1901 by rail from Christchurch to Dunedin. They then returned to Lyttelton via the same route before embarking for Tasmania on 27 June 1901 on HMS Ophir, a purposely converted ocean liner of the Orient Line.

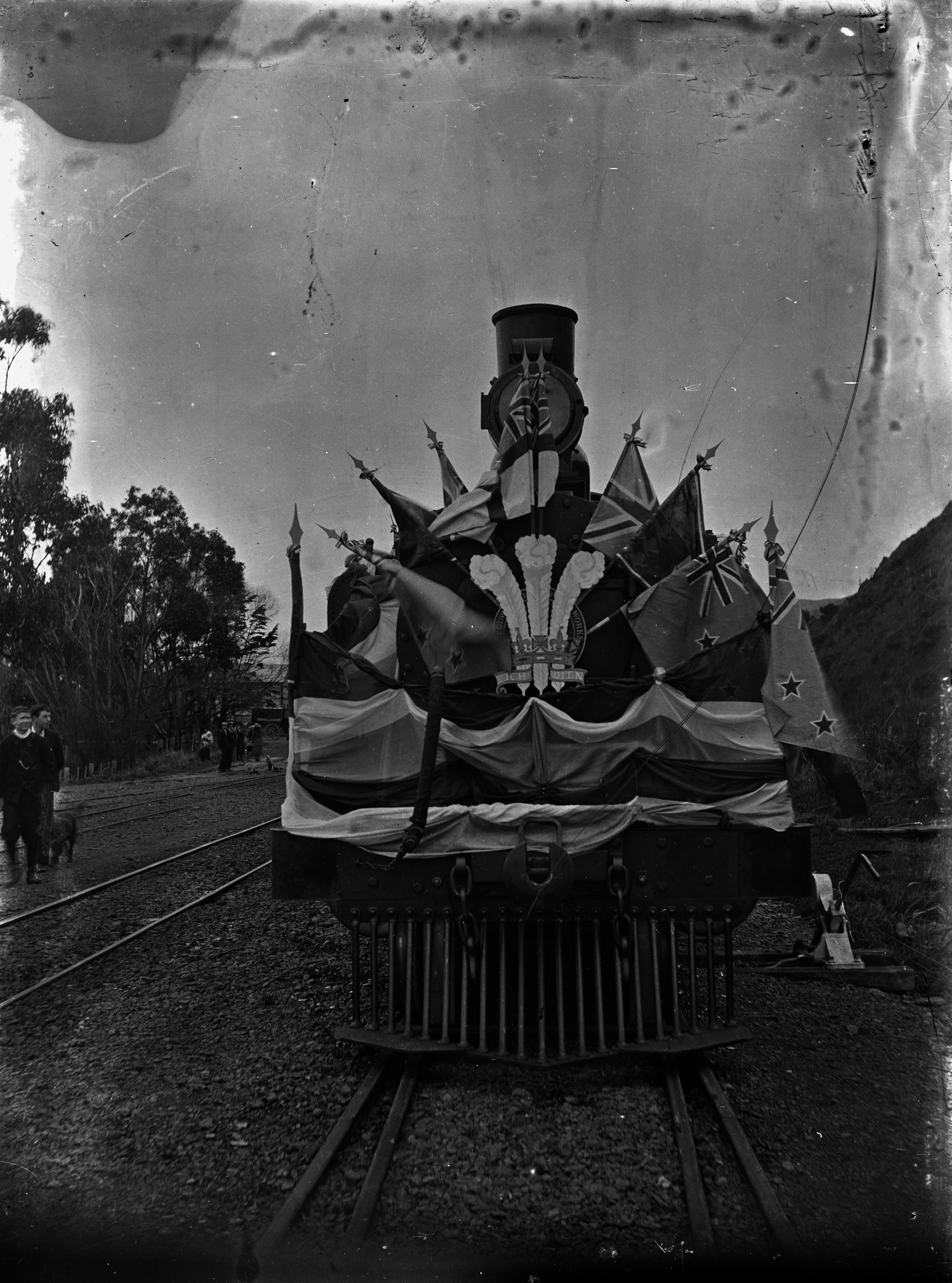
Decoration on the front of the locomotive, 1901

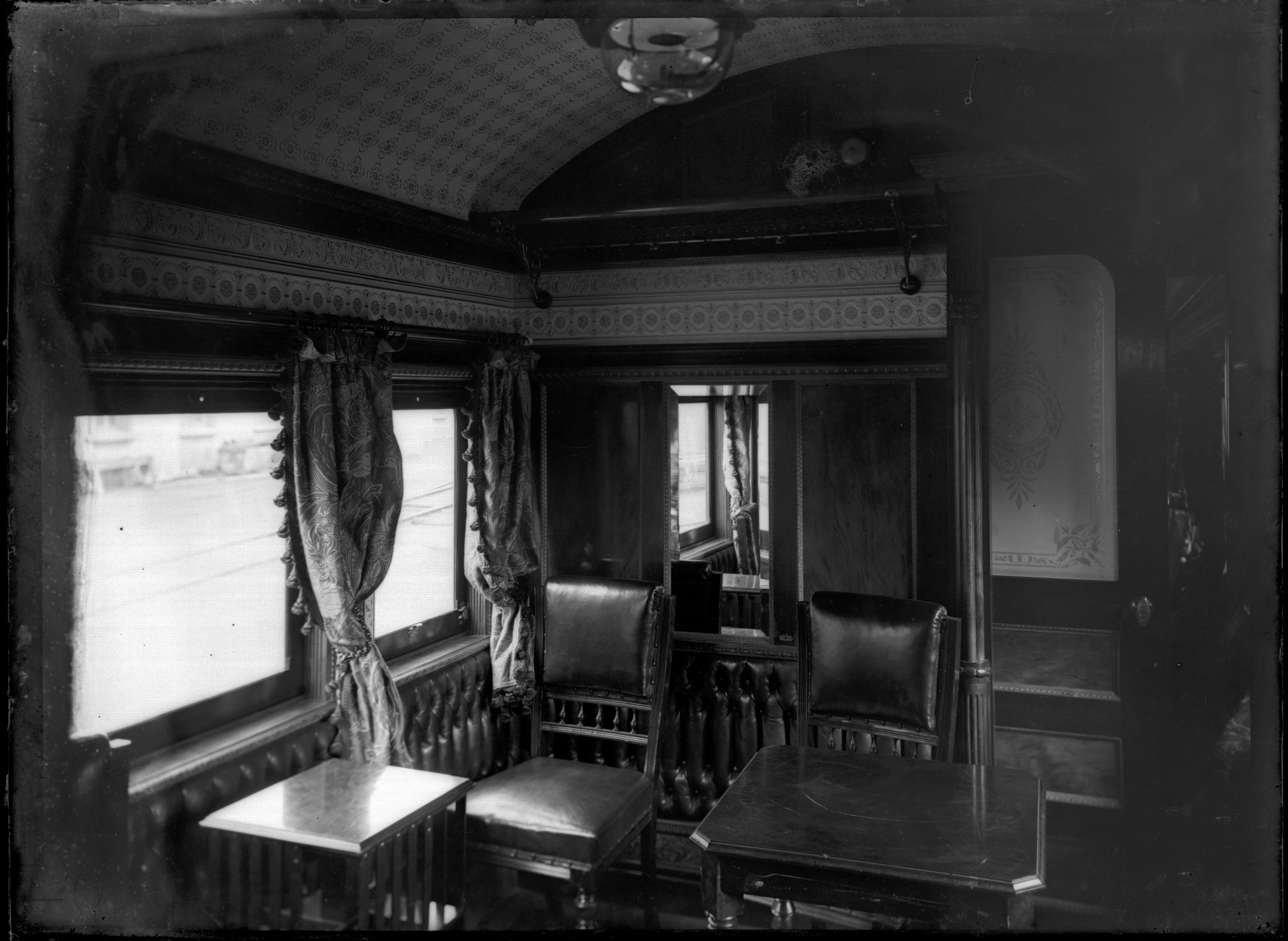
Dining area inside the royal train carriage, 1901

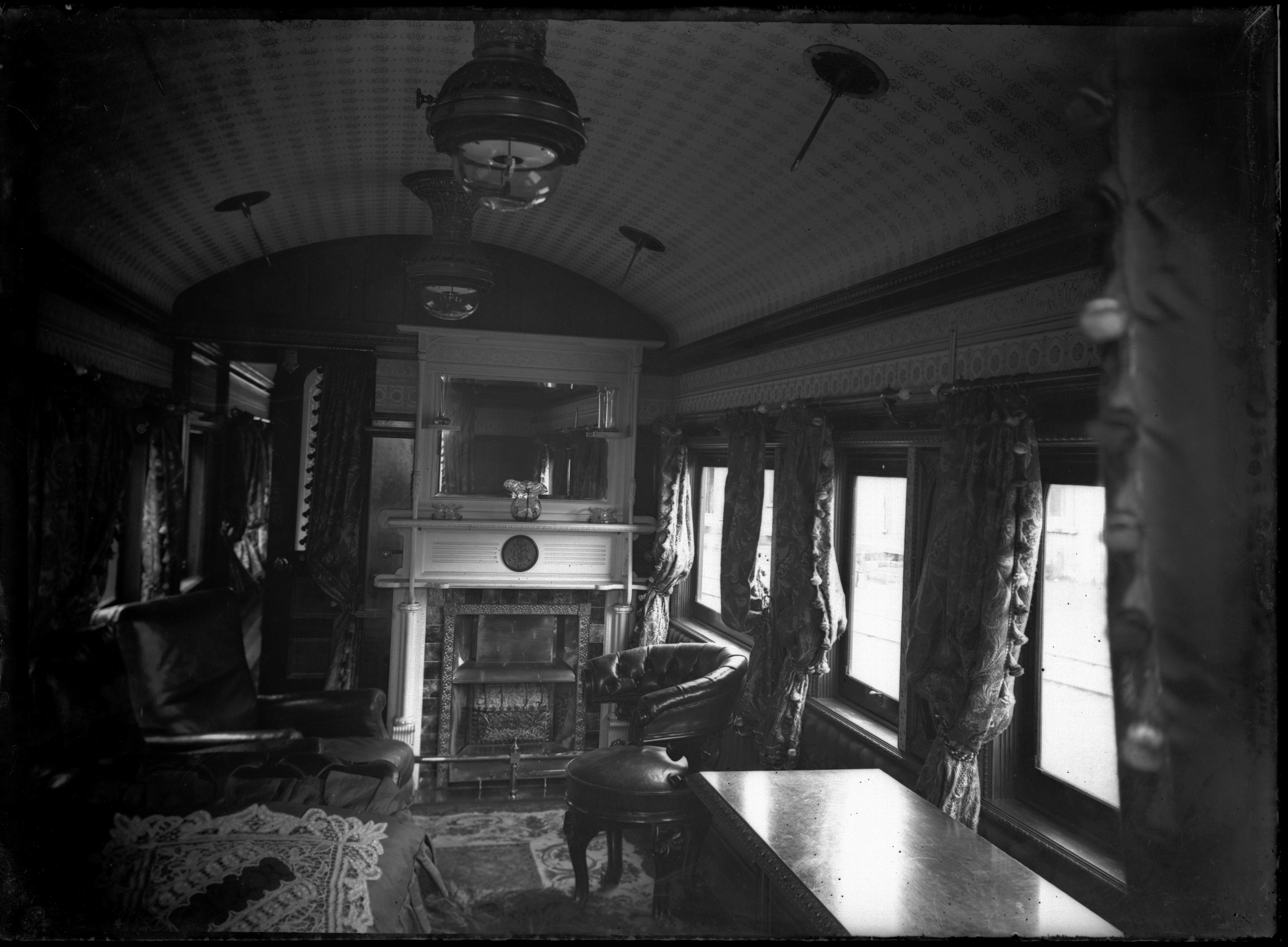
Lounge area inside the royal train carriage, 1901

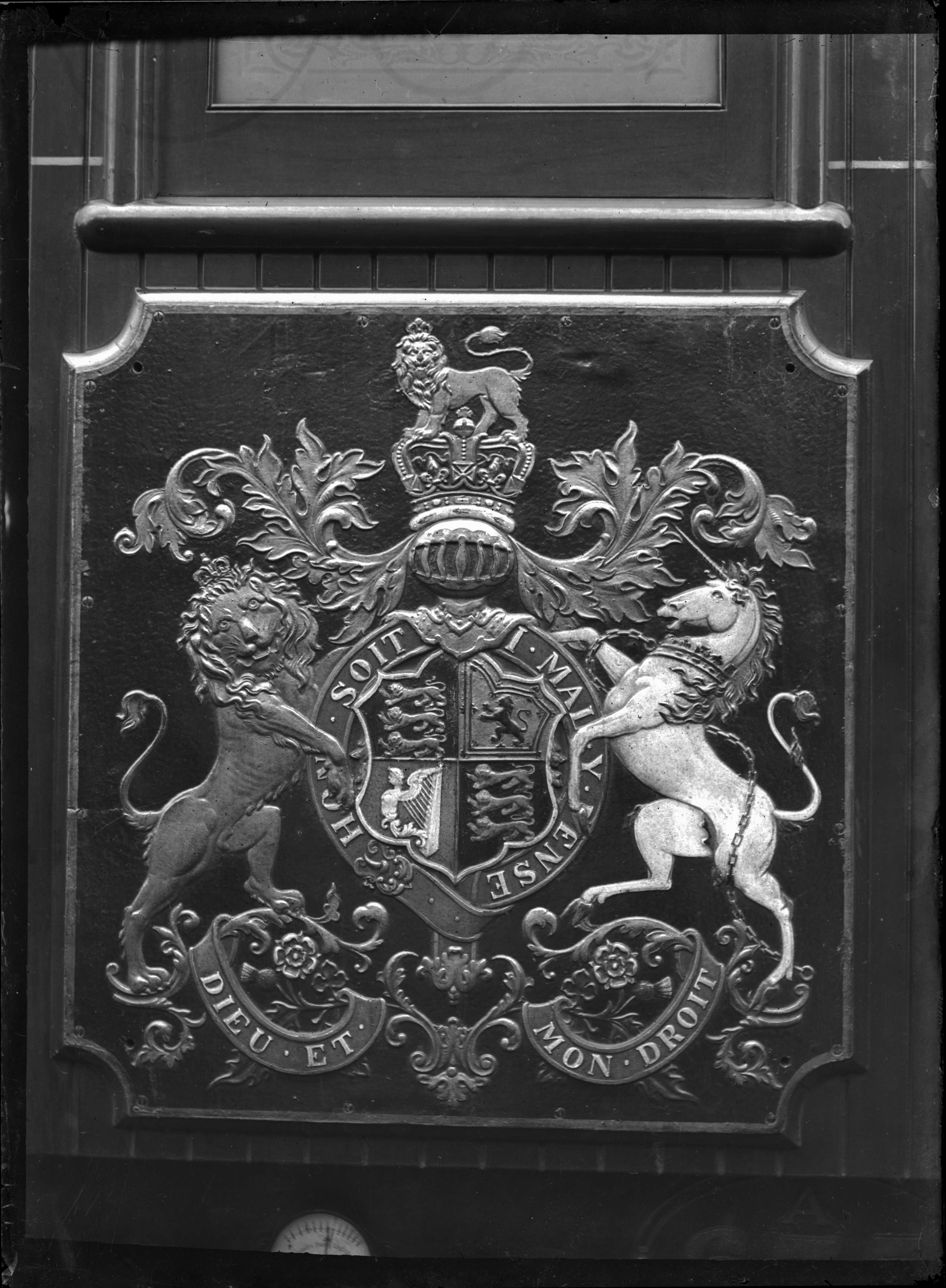
Royal coat of arms on the carriage, 1901

== The Prince of Wales, 1920 ==
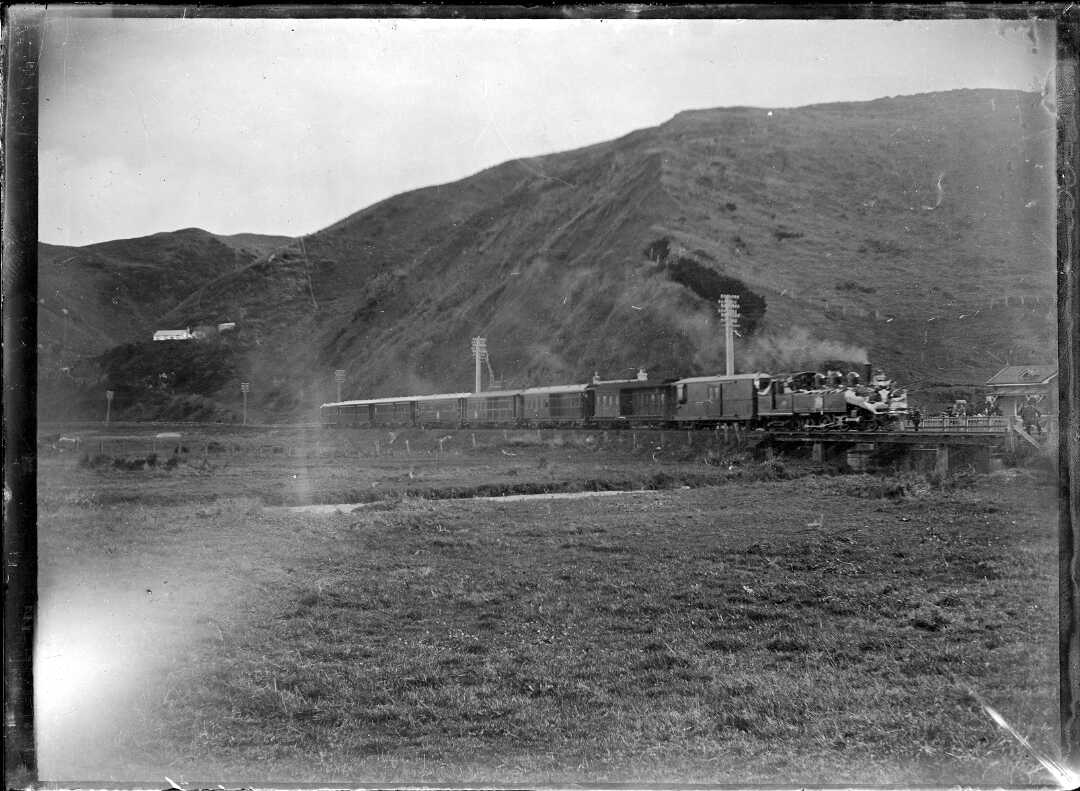
View of the train used for the Royal visit of 1920

George V's eldest son Edward Albert Christian George Andrew Patrick David (Edward VIII), Prince of Wales used the same train to travel from Auckland to Rotorua on 27 April 1920. The journey was disturbed by a rail strike, causing him to return to Auckland. He stayed there on HMS Renown, Britain's newest and largest battleship at the time, until he finally travelled in the Royal train to Wellington on 5 May 1920. Afterwards, Edward embarked on the Renown for the town of Picton on the South Island.

== Duke and Duchess of York, 1927 ==
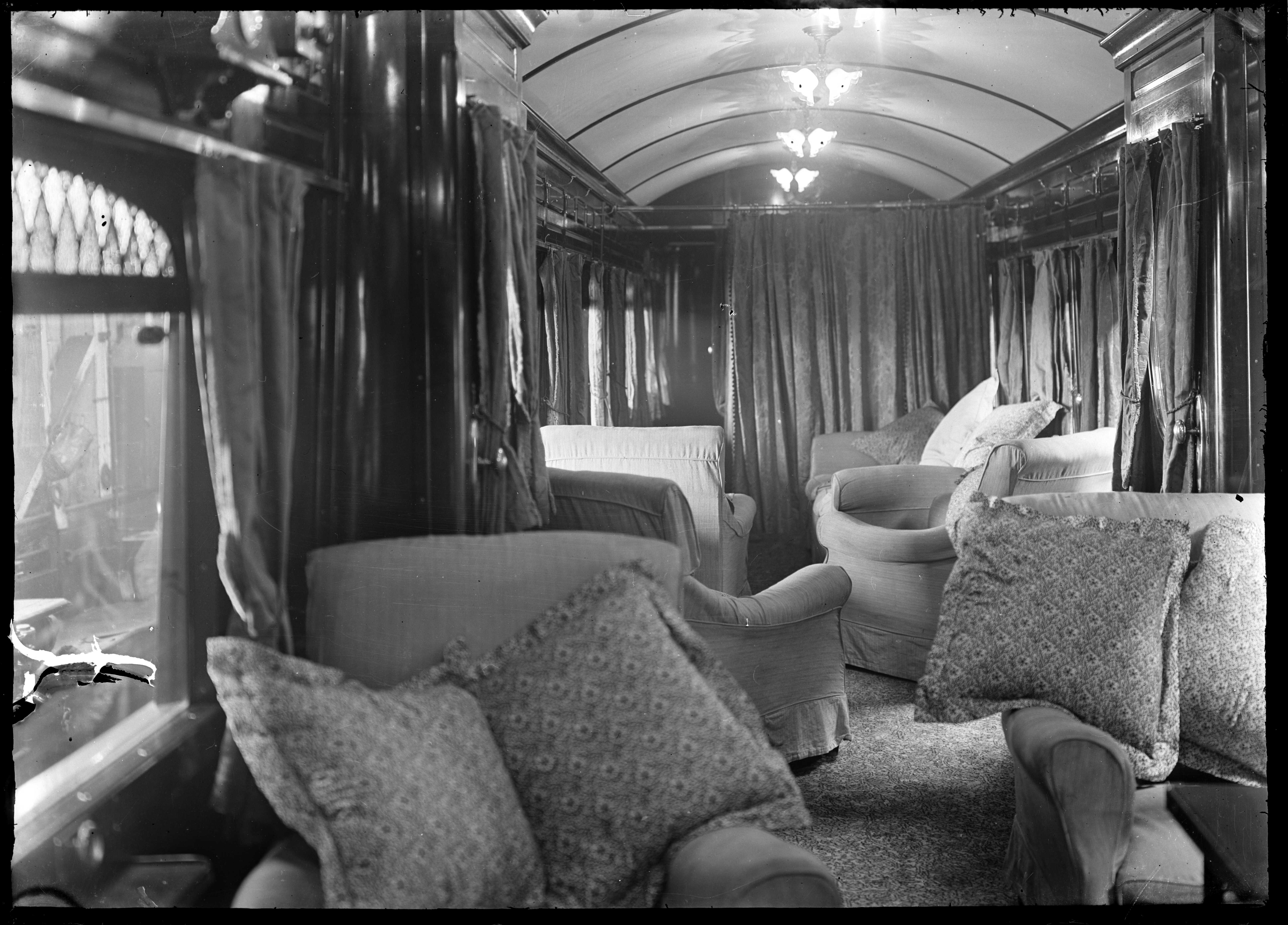
Royal train near Dunedin on the Royal Tour of the Duke and Duchess of York, 1927

George VI and his wife, Lady Elizabeth Bowes-Lyon, travelled by train and car to Rotorua on 24 February 1927, where a World War I memorial was unveiled. They then visited many cities on the North Island. In Nelson, the Duchess fell ill with tonsillitis and could not continue on the journey. The Duke travelled alone by train and car to Christchurch on the west coast, where he received the Freedom of the City. On 22 March 1927, he and his wife continued their journey to Australia.

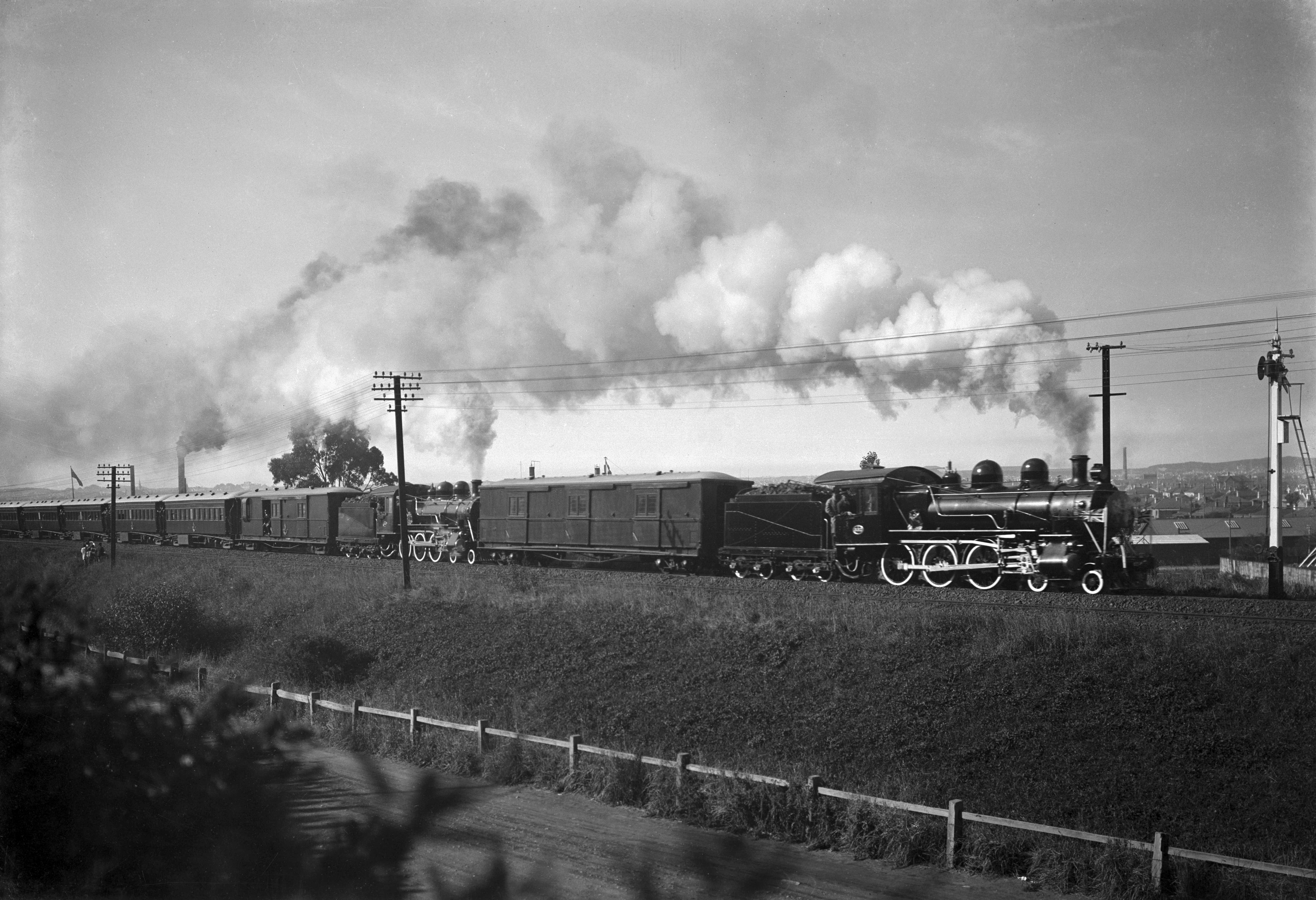
Royal train near Dunedin on the Royal Tour of the Duke and Duchess of York, 1927

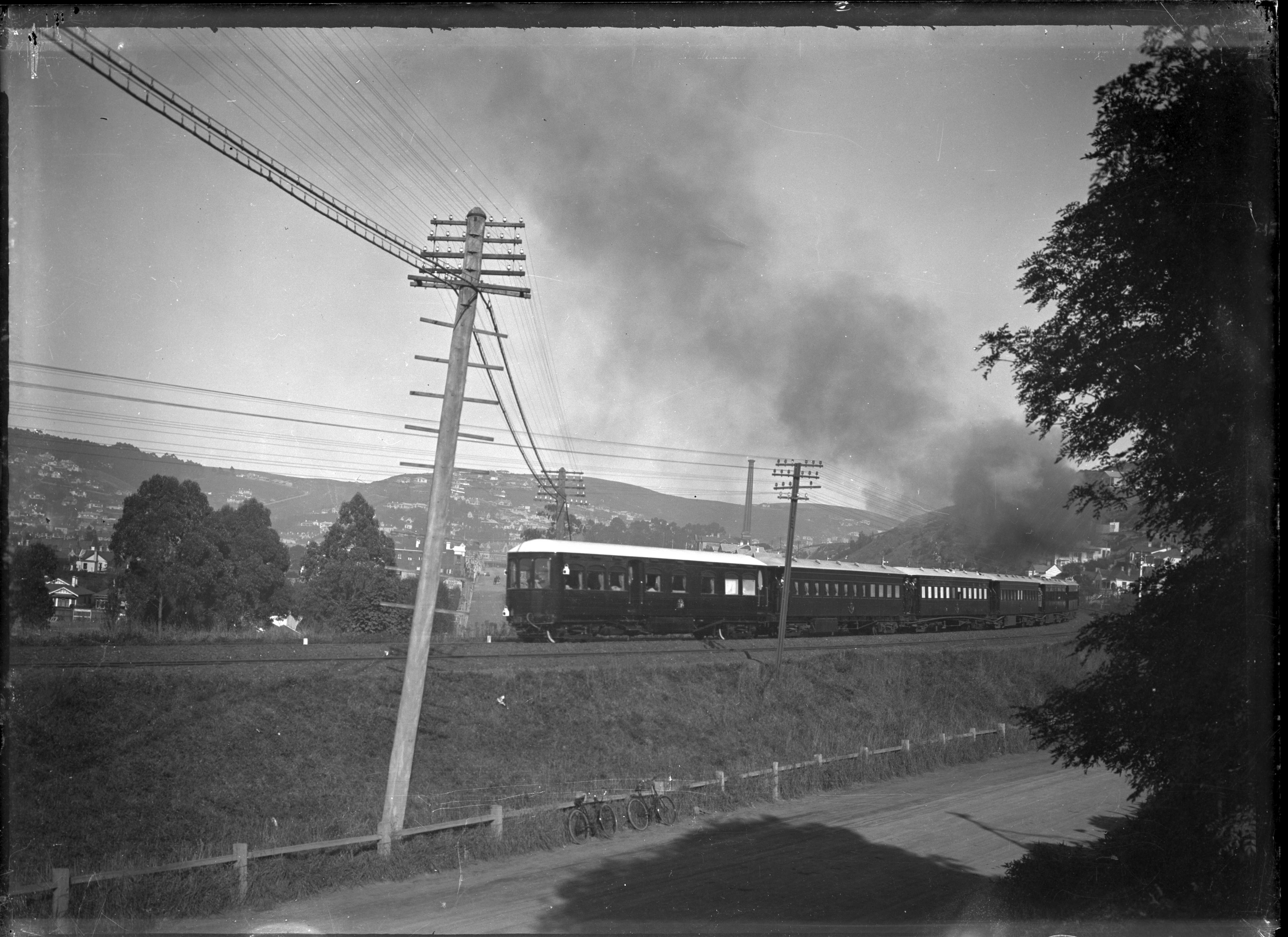
Royal train near Dunedin on the Royal Tour of the Duke and Duchess of York, 1927

== Royal passenger cars ==
In 1927 two passenger cars were built in the Petone Workshops for that year's royal tour by the Duke of York (later King George VI); they were then hired to tourists or used as Ministerial cars. In 1934 two passenger cars were built for the tour of the Duke of Gloucester. They were later used by the Governor-General and refurbished for the 1953–1954 royal tour by Queen Elizabeth II. With separate rail networks, one car was required for each island.
