= State visit by Juan Carlos I to the United Kingdom =

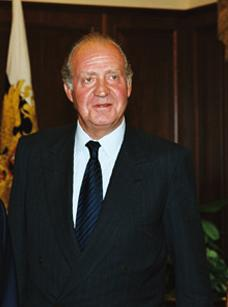
Juan Carlos I

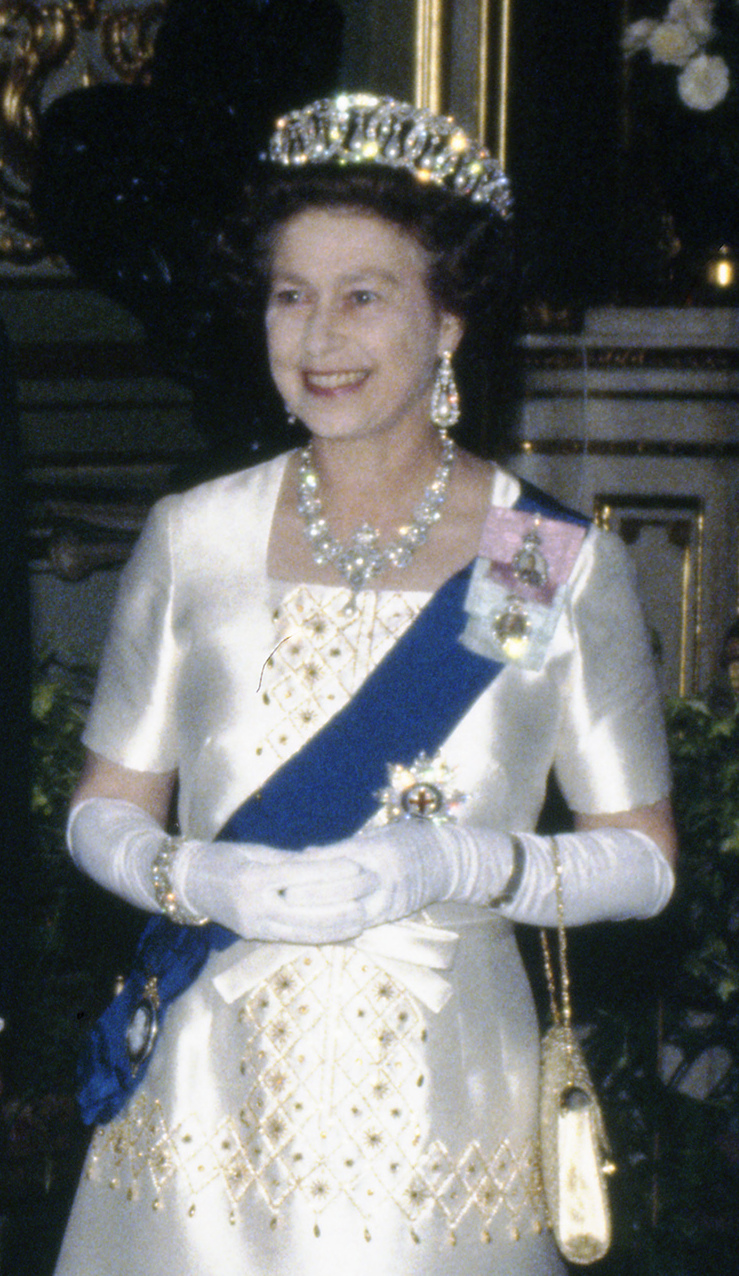
Elizabeth II

From 22 to 25 April 1986, King Juan Carlos I of Spain made a state visit to the United Kingdom, where he was received by Queen Elizabeth II. It was the first official state visit by Spain to the United Kingdom since 1905, and came during a thaw in relations between the two countries over the issue of Gibraltar.

== Background ==
The visit came as part of the normalisation of relations between Spain and the United Kingdom, following the Brussels Agreement of 1984 on the status of Gibraltar. The Spanish royal couple had refused to attend the Wedding of Prince Charles and Lady Diana Spencer in 1981 as the honeymoon was in Gibraltar.

It was the first official visit by a Spanish monarch to the United Kingdom since 1905, when King Alfonso XIII, grandfather of Juan Carlos I, was invited by King Edward VII. Several personal visits had been made before the 1986 state visit: the king and queen of Spain came to London at the invitation of Lord Mountbatten in 1978 for lunch with the British queen, and in 1984 Juan Carlos came to Britain to hunt with the Earl of Strathmore, a nephew of the Queen Mother. The visit was announced in July 1985.

According to Spanish broadsheet El País, "the visit means, in the opinion of political analysts in the British capital, a milestone in the history of both countries and can be considered the most significant of those made in Europe by Juan Carlos in his nearly 11 years of reign".

== Events ==
The state visit began one day after Elizabeth II's 60th birthday. Security was at a high level due to the threat of reprisals from the Libyan Arab Jamahiriya; American planes based in Britain had recently attacked the North African country. The Spanish royal couple were met at Heathrow Airport by Prince Charles and Diana, Princess of Wales.

On 23 April, Juan Carlos I became the first foreign monarch to speak to the British parliament in the Palace of Westminster. He gave his speech in English and called for peaceful resolution of the question of Gibraltar. He received an ovation of Viva España and Viva el Rey, led by the speaker, Bernard Weatherill. He then met prime minister Margaret Thatcher at 10 Downing Street.

Juan Carlos I was made doctor honoris causa in civil law by the University of Oxford on 24 April. That night, a dinner was held at the Embassy of Spain, London, with surprise guests being his daughters Elena and Cristina, as well as Princess Irene of Greece and Denmark, his wife's sister.

== Subsequent events ==
In October 1988, Elizabeth II made the first official state visit by a British monarch to Spain. No official state visit was made by Spain to the United Kingdom until June 2018, by Juan Carlos I's son and successor Felipe VI.
