= Berta Craveiro Lopes =

First Lady of Portugal (1951–1958)

Berta da Costa Ribeiro Arthur Craveiro Lopes
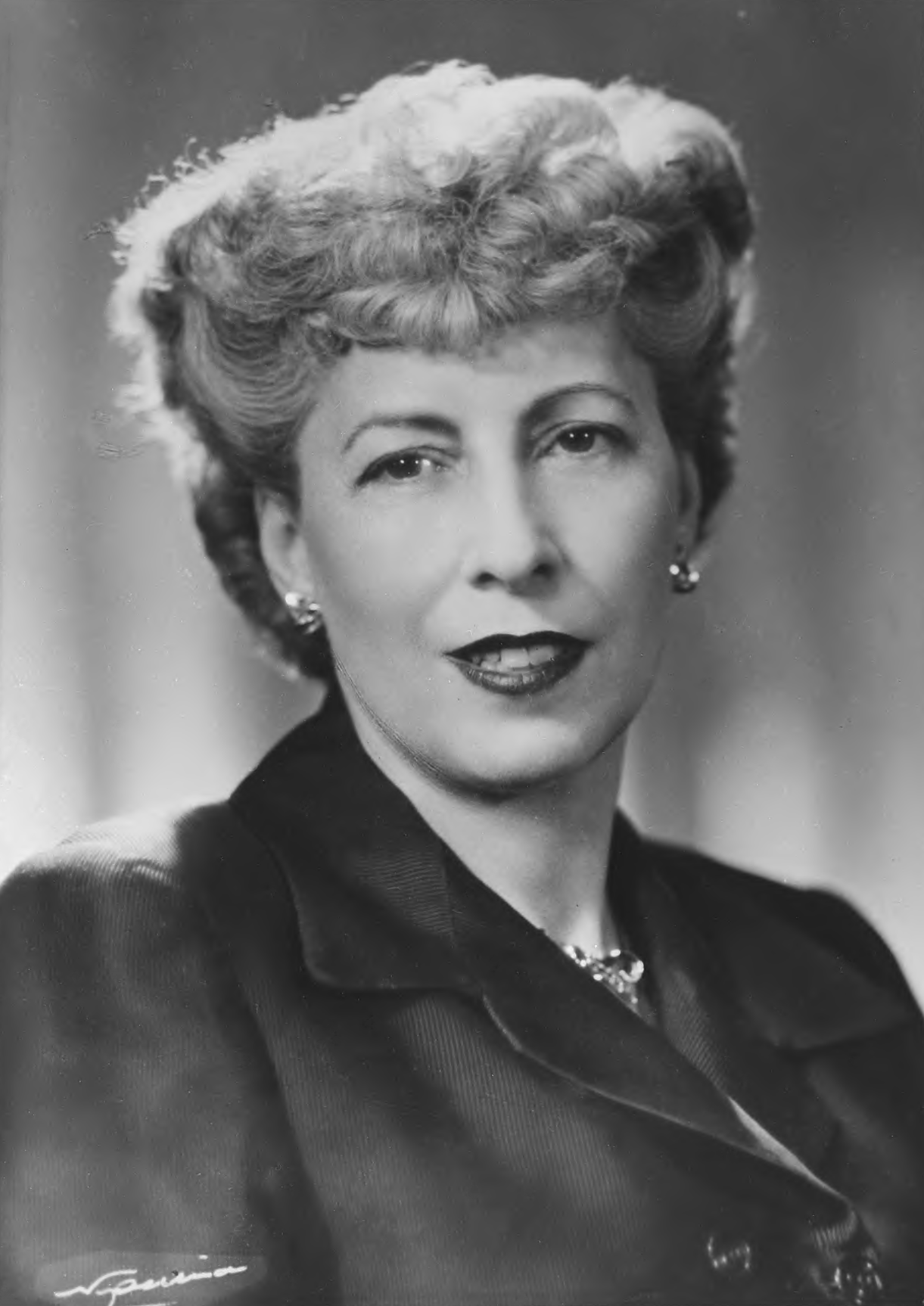

First Lady of Portugal
- In office 9 August 1951 – 5 July 1958 (death)

Personal details
- Born: Berta da Costa Ribeiro Arthur; 12 April 1894 Lisbon, Kingdom of Portugal
- Died: 5 July 1958 (aged 58) Lisbon
- Resting place: Prazeres Cemetery, Lisbon
- Spouse: Francisco Craveiro Lopes
- Children: 4

Berta da Costa Ribeiro Arthur Craveiro Lopes (1899–1958) was the wife of the 12th President of the Portuguese Republic, Francisco Craveiro Lopes, and the country's First Lady from 9 August 1951, until her death on 5 July 1958.

== Early life ==
Berta Ribeiro Arthur was born in the Portuguese capital, Lisbon, on 15 October 1899 into a military family of English descent. She was the daughter of Sezinando Ribeiro Arthur (1875–1918) and Maria Clara Pereira. Her paternal grandfather, General Bartolomeu Ribeiro Arthur, was descended from an English soldier who went to Portugal at the time of the Peninsular War to defend Portugal from the French. Her father's relationship with Pereira, a family maid, which his parents strongly opposed, forced their separation. Her father moved to Mozambique and her mother to Brazil, leaving the couple's two children to live with their paternal grandparents. Following her grandfather's death, she left with her grandmother, brother, and two aunts for Lourenço Marques (now Maputo), capital of Portuguese Mozambique, where her father was working as a high-ranking official in the railways. In Mozambique she met a young pilot-lieutenant, Francisco Higino Craveiro Lopes. They married on 22 November 1918, when she was 18. They had four children: João Carlos, Nuno, Maria João, and Manuel.

== Later life ==
She followed her husband to various places where he served, including India, where he held several positions, culminating in that of Governor General of Portuguese India (1936–1938). In 1939, they returned to Portugal, where her husband commanded the Tancos Air Base; in 1941 also being appointed as Director-General of Civil Aeronautics. Between 1941 and 1944 the family were on Terceira Island in the Azores, where her husband commanded the Lajes Air Base. In August 1951 he was elected as the 12th President of Portugal in an uncontested election after having been proposed by the prime minister, António de Oliveira Salazar, who effectively ran the country.

As First Lady of Portugal, she played an active role, accompanying her husband on various official trips, including to Spain, South Africa, Brazil, the UK, and all the Portuguese colonies. The state visit to the United Kingdom in 1955 was the first time a Portuguese president had officially visited that country. The visit to London was conducted with considerable pomp. She and her husband arrived by the Portuguese naval vessel, Bartolomeu Dias, which moored in the Pool of London. The couple formally began the visit on 25 October by travelling up the Thames from the Tower of London on a Royal Barge, to be met by Queen Elizabeth II and the Duke of Edinburgh at Westminster Pier. The Queen and the President and other members of the party then proceeded in an open-carriage procession to Buckingham Palace. Other events included a state banquet at the Palace, a lunch hosted by the Lord Mayor of London at the Guildhall, a dinner at the Portuguese Embassy for the Queen and Duke, a Gala Performance of Smetana's opera, The Bartered Bride, at the Royal Opera House, Covent Garden, and the official opening at the Royal Academy of an exhibition called The Art of Portugal. While her husband pursued his flying interests with a visit to RAF Harwell, she visited a crèche and a care home in London and the Wallace Collection, a major museum in London. The visit was considered to have been a great success by both the British and Portuguese press. A Pathé News report stressed that although state visits were not uncommon, the full pageantry accorded to the couple was rarely seen, which was "a fitting tribute to Britain's oldest ally".

In February 1957, Queen Elizabeth returned the visit, with the First Lady again playing an important role. Before that, she and her husband had visited the Union of South Africa and the Portuguese colonies of Angola and Mozambique. In Mozambique's capital, a garden was established and named after her, with a bust of her (no longer there) by the Portuguese sculptor Leopoldo de Almeida. In June 1957, she accompanied her husband to Brazil, visiting twelve cities in three weeks.

== Death ==
Berta Craveiro Lopes died unexpectedly at the Belém National Palace, the official residence of the president, on 5 July 1958, a victim of a stroke. This was just a month before her husband's term ended. She was buried in the family vault in the Prazeres Cemetery of Lisbon.

In addition to the garden in Maputo, her name was given to a kindergarten in Benguela, Angola; a secondary school in Guinea-Bissau; and a street in São Vicente, São Paulo, Brazil.
