= List of official overseas trips made by George V =

King George V succeeded to the throne of the United Kingdom in May 1910. Before his accession, he made extensive tours of territories of the British Empire or under British control as the heir to the throne, including Australia, New Zealand, South Africa, Canada and India. He attended in person the Delhi Durbar of 1911 which celebrated his coronation, becoming thus the first and only Emperor of India to set foot on British Raj. Due to the outbreak of World War I and his poor health in post-War years, he only made a few state visits to other countries, including the first official visit to the Pope by a British monarch since the English Reformation.

== Official tours of territories of the British Empire or under British control as heir to the throne ==
Tour of overseas territories as Duke of Cornwall and York from March to October 1901: (Note: The voyages were on board RMS Ophir.)
Date	Territory	Areas visited	Host
20–22 March 1901	Gibraltar		Governor Sir George White
25–27 March 1901	Malta	Valletta	Governor Sir Francis Grenfell
30 March 1901	Khedivate of Egypt (Note: An autonomous tributary state of the Ottoman Empire under British control.)	Port Said	Prince Mohammed Ali; Consul-General Lord Cromer
5 April 1901	Aden Settlement (Note: A territory under the administration of the British Raj.)	Aden	Acting Resident George More-Molyneux
12–16 April 1901	Ceylon	Colombo, Kandy	Governor Sir West Ridgeway
21–23 April 1901	Straits Settlements	Singapore	Acting Governor Sir Alexander Swettenham
30 April – 6 June, 3–26 July, 1901	Australia (Note: A newly federated Dominion. The Duke came to open its first Parliament.)	Western Australia (Albany, Perth), Victoria (Melbourne, Ballarat), Queensland (Brisbane), New South Wales (Newcastle, Sydney), Tasmania (Hobart), South Australia (Adelaide, Glenelg)	Governor-General Lord Hopetoun; Governor Sir Arthur Lawley; Governor Lord Lamington; Governor Lord Tennyson
11–28 June 1901	Colony of New Zealand	Auckland, Rotorua, Wellington, Christchurch, Dunedin	Governor Lord Ranfurly
4–8 August 1901	Mauritius	Port Louis	Governor Sir Charles Bruce
13–15 August 1901	Natal	Durban, Pietermaritzburg	Governor Sir Henry McCallum
19–23 August 1901	Cape Colony	Simon's Town, Cape Town	Governor Sir Walter Hely-Hutchinson
16 September – 21 October 1901	Canada	Quebec (Quebec City, Montreal), Ontario (Ottawa, Toronto, Niagara Falls, Hamilton, Kingston), Manitoba (Winnipeg), Saskatchewan (Regina), Alberta (Calgary, Banff), British Columbia (Vancouver, Victoria), New Brunswick (Saint John), Nova Scotia (Halifax)	Governor General Lord Minto
24 October 1901	Newfoundland	St John's	Governor Sir Cavendish Boyle
Tour of India as Prince of Wales from November 1905 to April 1906: (Note: The voyages were on board HMS Renown.)
Date	Territory	Areas visited	Host
9 November 1905 – 19 March 1906	India	Bombay Presidency (Bombay, Karachi), Punjab Province (Lahore, Rawalpindi, Amritsar, Delhi), North-West Frontier Province (Peshawar), United Provinces of Agra and Oudh (Agra, Lucknow, Aligarh), Bengal Presidency (Calcutta), Burma Province (Rangoon, Mandalay), Madras Presidency (Madras), Baluchistan Province (Quetta), 9 Princely states (see below)	Viceroy Lord Curzon (Note: After welcoming the Prince in Bombay, Curzon ended his term as Viceroy in November 1905 and was succeeded by Minto.); Viceroy Lord Minto; Governor Lord Lamington; Governor Lord Ampthill
15–17 November 1905	Indore (Note: A princely state of the British Raj.)	Indore	Maharaja Tukojirao Holkar III
18–20 November 1905	Udaipur	Udaipur	Maharana Fateh Singh
21–23 November 1905	Jaipur	Jaipur	Maharaja Madho Singh II
24–27 November 1905	Bikaner	Bikaner	Maharaja Ganga Singh
9–10 December 1905	Jammu and Kashmir	Jammu	Maharaja Pratap Singh
20–25 December 1905	Gwalior	Gwalior	Maharaja Madho Rao Scindia
29 January – 7 February 1906	Mysore	Mysore, Bangalore	Maharaja Krishna Raja Wadiyar IV
8–15 February 1906	Hyderabad	Hyderabad	Nizam Mahboob Ali Khan
18–21 February 1906	Benares	Benares	Maharaja Prabhu Narayan Singh
29 March – 5 April 1906	Khedivate of Egypt	Cairo	Khedive Abbas II; Consul-General Lord Cromer
Tour of Canada as Prince of Wales in July 1908 to attend the Tercentenary of Quebec: (Note: The voyages were on board HMS Indomitable.)
Date	Territory	Areas visited	Host
22–28 July 1908	Canada	Quebec (Quebec City)	Governor General Lord Grey

== State visits as King ==
Date	Country	Areas visited	Host
21–24 April 1914	France	Paris, Calais	President Raymond Poincaré
8–11 May 1922 (Note: One of the main purposes of this visit was to pay tribute to World War I cemeteries and memorials being constructed in Belgium and northern France by the Imperial War Graves Commission which was dubbed "The King's Pilgrimage".)	Belgium	Brussels, Zeebrugge, Zonnebeke, Tyne Cot, Ypres, Vlamertinge, Brandhoek, Poperinghe, Lijssenthoek	King Albert I
7–14 May 1923 (Note: One of the main purposes of this visit was to pay tribute to World War I cemeteries and memorials of British soldiers in northern Italy.)	Italy	Pisa, Civitavecchia, Rome, Tivoli, Vicenza, Montecchio Precalcino, Asiago	King Victor Emmanuel III
9 May 1923	Holy See	Vatican City	Pope Pius XI

== Official tours of territories of the British Empire or under British control as King-Emperor ==
Tour of India to attend Delhi Durbar from November 1911 to February 1912: (Note: The King took part in a hunting trip in Nepal over 18–28 December 1911 arranged by the Prime Minister. The voyages were on board RMS Medina.)
Date	Territory	Areas visited	Host
20–22 November 1911	Khedivate of Egypt	Port Said	Khedive Abbas II; Consul-General Lord Kitchener
27 November 1911	Aden Settlement	Aden	Resident Sir James Alexander Bell
2–17 December 1911, 29 December 1911 – 10 January 1912	India	Bombay Presidency (Bombay), Punjab Province (Delhi), Bengal Presidency (Calcutta), Central Provinces and Berar (Nagpur)	Viceroy Lord Hardinge; Governor Sir George Clarke
17 January 1912	(United Kingdom) (Khedivate of Egypt) Anglo-Egyptian Sudan (Note: A territory whose sovereignty and administration were shared between both Egypt and the United Kingdom in name but was in practice under British control.)	Port Sudan, Suakin, Sinkat	Consul-General Lord Kitchener; Governor-General Sir Reginald Wingate
24–27 January 1912	Malta	Valletta	Governor Sir Leslie Rundle
30 January – 1 February 1912	Gibraltar		Governor Sir Archibald Hunter

== See also ==
- List of state visits received by George V
- List of official overseas trips made by Edward VII, his predecessor
- List of official overseas trips made by Edward VIII, his successor
