= List of official overseas trips made by George VI =

King George VI succeeded to the thrones of the United Kingdom and the dominions in December 1936. As Duke of York, he made official tours of British colonies in East Africa as well as New Zealand and Australia. Due to the outbreak of World War II and his poor health in post-War years, he only made two state visits to other countries as King, one of which was the first state visit of a British monarch to the United States. He also made a few official tours of different parts of the British Empire and Commonwealth, making him the first reigning British monarch to set foot on North America and Southern Africa as well as the first King of Canada and the only King of South Africa to visit the respective countries.

== Official tours as Duke of York ==
Visit to Yugoslavia in October 1923:
Date	Country/Territory	Areas visited	Host
18 – 25 October 1923	Yugoslavia (Note: En route to Yugoslavia, Albert and Elizabeth passed through France and Italy.)	Belgrade	
Tour of East Africa from December 1924 to April 1925:
Date	Country/Territory	Areas visited	Host
22 December 1924 – 7 February 1925	Kenya	Mombasa, Nairobi, Isiolo	Governor Sir Robert Coryndon (Note: Coryndon was deceased right after the end of the Duke's visit. The Duke returned to Nairobi to attend his funeral on 11 February.)
13 February – 11 March 1925	Uganda	Jinja, Entebbe, Kampala, Fort Portal	Acting Governor Edward Blackwell Jarvis
8–9 April 1925	(United Kingdom) (Kingdom of Egypt) Anglo-Egyptian Sudan (Note: A territory whose sovereignty and administration were shared between both Egypt and the United Kingdom in name but was in practice under British control.)	Khartoum	Governor-General Sir Geoffrey Archer
Tour of Australia, New Zealand and overseas territories from January to June 1927: (Note: The voyages were on board HMS Renown.)
Date	Country/Territory	Areas visited	Host
20–23 January 1927	Jamaica	Kingston, Spanish Town	Governor Sir Edward Stubbs
17–19 February 1927	Fiji	Suva	Governor Sir Eyre Hutson
22 February – 22 March 1927	New Zealand	Auckland, Rotorua, Palmerston North, Napier, Wellington, Nelson, Christchurch, Dunedin	Governor-General Sir Charles Fergusson
27 March – 23 May 1927	Australia	New South Wales (Sydney, Newcastle), Queensland (Toowoomba, Brisbane), Tasmania (Hobart, Launceston), Victoria (Melbourne), South Australia (Adelaide), Federal Capital Territory (Canberra), Western Australia (Perth)	Governor-General Lord Stonehaven; Governor Sir Dudley de Chair; Governor Sir James O'Grady; Governor Lord Somers; Governor Sir Tom Bridges; Governor Sir William Campion
1–3 June 1927	Mauritius	Port Louis, Curepipe	Governor Sir Herbert James Read
17–20 June 1927	Malta	Valletta, Attard	Governor Sir John Du Cane
23 June 1927	Gibraltar		Governor Sir Charles Monro
Visit to France from November to December 1935:
Date	Country/Territory	Areas visited	Host
29 November – 2 December 1935	France		

== State visits as King ==
As King of the United Kingdom
Date	Country	Areas visited	Host
19–22 July 1938	France	Paris, Versailles	President Albert Lebrun
As King of Canada
Date	Country	Areas visited	Host
7–11 June 1939	United States	Washington, D.C., Mount Vernon, New York City, Hyde Park	President Franklin Roosevelt

== Official tours of Dominions and territories of the British Empire as King ==
Tour of North America from May to June 1939:
Date	Country/Territory	Areas visited	Host
17 May – 7 June, 12–15 June, 1939	Canada	Quebec (Quebec City, Montreal, Sherbrooke), Ontario (Ottawa, Toronto, Greater Sudbury, Fort William, Guelph, Kitchener, Waterloo, Stratford, Windsor, London, Brantford, Hamilton, Niagara Falls), Manitoba (Winnipeg, Brandon, Portage la Prairie), Saskatchewan (Regina, Saskatoon), Alberta (Calgary, Medicine Hat, Moose Jaw, Banff, Jasper, Edmonton), British Columbia (Vancouver, Victoria, New Westminster, Chilliwack), New Brunswick (Saint John), Prince Edward Island (Charlottetown), Nova Scotia (Truro, Halifax)	Governor General Lord Tweedsmuir
17 June 1939	Dominion of Newfoundland (Note: A dominion in name which had lost its responsible government and was governed by a Commission of Government under British supervision.)	St. John's	Governor Sir Humphrey Walwyn
Tour of Mediterranean area in June 1943: (Note: Part of The King's visits to the front during World War II. He also visited Allied forces in Morocco, Algeria, Tunisia and Libya.)
Date	Country/Territory	Areas visited	Host
20–21 June 1943	Malta	Valletta, Senglea, Siġġiewi, Mosta	Governor Lord Gort
Tour of Southern Africa from February to April 1947: (Note: Accompanied by Princess Elizabeh and Princess Margaret. The voyages were on board HMS Vanguard.)
Date	Country/Territory	Areas visited	Host
17 February – 11 March, 13–24 March, 26 March – 7 April, 17–24 April, 1947	Union of South Africa	Cape Province (Cape Town, Simon's Town, Paarl, Stellenbosch, Worcester, George, Graaff-Reinet, Port Elizabeth, New Brighton, Uitenhage, Grahamstown, East London, King William's Town, Umtata, Queenstown, Kimberley), Orange Free State (Bloemfontein, Kroonstad, Bethlehem, Harrismith), Natal (Ladysmith, Estcourt, Eshowe, Pietermaritzburg, Durban, Vryheid), Transvaal (Ermelo, Pretoria, Johannesburg, Pietersburg)	Governor-General Gideon Brand van Zyl
11–12 March 1947	Basutoland	Maseru	High Commissioner Sir Evelyn Baring; Resident Commissioner Aubrey Denzil Forsyth-Thompson; Regent 'Mantšebo
25 March 1947	Swaziland	Goedgegun	High Commissioner Sir Evelyn Baring; Resident Commissioner Edward Beetham; Chief Sobhuza II
7–10, 12–16, April 1947	Southern Rhodesia	Salisbury, Victoria Falls, Bulawayo, Matopos	Governor Sir John Kennedy
11 April 1947	Northern Rhodesia	Livingstone	Governor Sir John Waddington
17 April 1947	Bechuanaland	Loatsi	Resident Commissioner Anthony Sillery
29 April 1947	Saint Helena		Acting Governor Frank Edward Gilpin

== See also ==
- List of state visits received by George VI
- List of official overseas trips made by Queen Elizabeth the Queen Mother
- List of official overseas trips made by Edward VIII, his predecessor
- List of state visits made by Elizabeth II, his successor
- List of Commonwealth official trips made by Elizabeth II
