= Economy of Manchester =

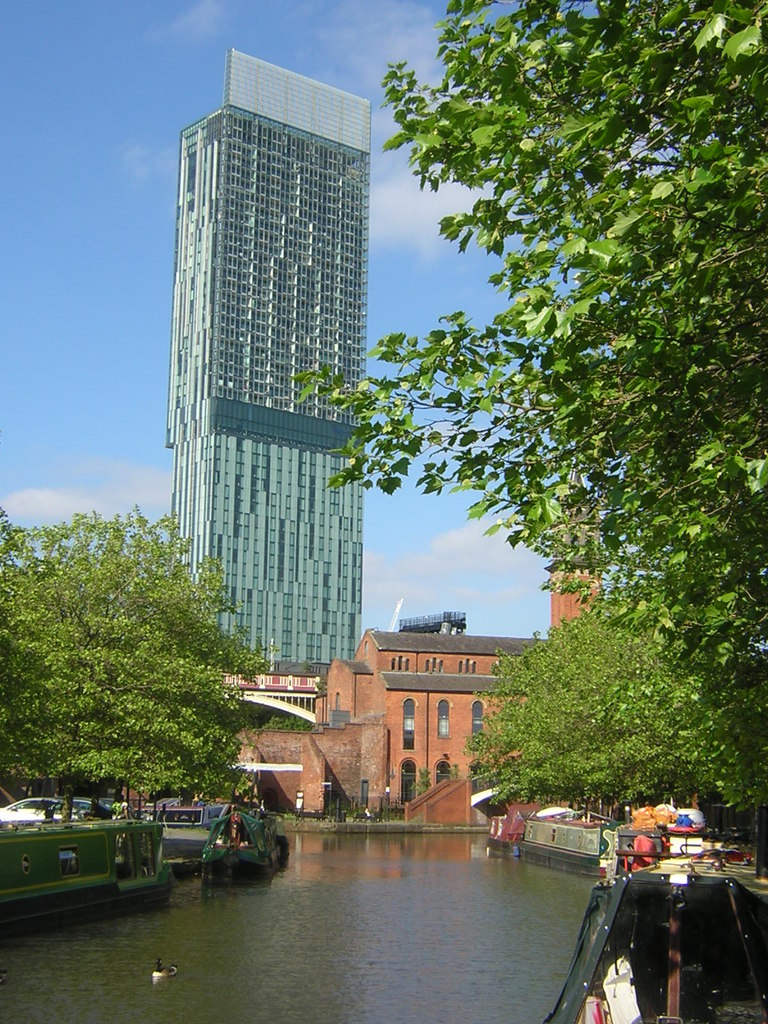
- The Beetham Tower, one of the largest buildings outside of London

Statistics
- Population: 579,917 (2023)
- GDP: £38.0 billion (2023)
- GDP per capita: £65,591 (2023)
- Labour force: 288,600 / 71.4% in employment (Jan–Dec 2023) (Note: In employment and aged 16 or over (quantity) or aged 16–64 (percent))
- Labour force by occupation: List: 39.5% Professional; 16.0% Associate professional; 10.4% Elementary occupations; 7.1% Sales and customer service; 7.0% Caring, leisure and other service; 7.0% Administrative and secretarial; 5.6% Managers, directors and senior officials; 4.2% Process plant and machine operatives; — Skilled trades; (Jan–Dec 2023) (Note: Percent is a proportion of all persons in employment aged 16 and over)
- Unemployment: 15,500 / 5.1% (Jan–Dec 2023) (Note: Unemployed aged 16 and over. Percent is a proportion of economically active.)
- Average gross salary: £634.80 per week (2023) (Note: Median gross weekly pay for full time employees resident in Manchester)

External
- Exports: £6.3 billion (2021) (Note: Goods and services)
- Export goods: £1.6 billion (2021) (Note: Excluding services)
- Imports: £5.6 billion (2021)
- Import goods: £3.4 billion (2021)

The economy of Manchester is among the largest in England. Manchester is a city and metropolitan borough of Greater Manchester. It lies within the United Kingdom's second-most populous urban area, with a population of 2.55 million. Manchester's commercial centre is in Manchester city centre, focused on Spinningfields, Mosley Street, Deansgate, King Street and Piccadilly Gardens.

Historically, the world's first industrialised city, the region was once in economic and population decline. In 2012 Greater Manchester South, which includes the cities of Manchester and Salford and three other metropolitan boroughs, was the largest NUTS3 area outside London in economic terms, and growth was 3.8% vs the Core Cities average of 2%. Between 2002 and 2012 Greater Manchester South grew 45% vs. national growth of 44%. Meanwhile, the 2011 census also showed that Manchester was the fastest growing city in the UK in terms of population. Manchester is also a city of contrast, where some of the UK's most deprived and most affluent neighbourhoods can be found. According to the 2010 Indices of Multiple Deprivation Manchester is the 4th most deprived local authority in England. On the other hand, Greater Manchester is home to more multi-millionaires than anywhere outside London, with the City of Manchester taking up most of the tally. In 2013 Manchester was ranked 6th in the UK for quality of life, according to a rating of the UK's 12 largest cities.

Manchester is considered to be a 'beta -' global city, rated as the second most globally influential city in the UK after London with Edinburgh third, Belfast fourth and Glasgow fifth. The region is now an economic knowledge-led centre, with research and enterprise clustered around the University of Manchester, where research ranked as the 16th in the UK according to the Times Higher Education Best Universities in the UK rankings for 2027. Typical industry areas include: digital and creative, financial, legal and business services, biotechnology, advanced manufacturing, environmental technologies, tourism, global sports brands, media and real estate. The city is also a key location for many foreign owned companies and headquarters, and almost half of the Northwest's Top 500 businesses. Manchester City Council also plays a uniquely active role in business, where it owns key infrastructures such as a 35.5% stake in Manchester Airports Group, which owns other UK airports such as London Stansted Airport, and is the owner of the City of Manchester Stadium, home to one of the world's highest earning football clubs.

== Economic indices ==
Below is a collection of economic indices featuring Manchester. While useful, surveys and indicators have limitations, and are at times subjective and incomplete. For example, no complete list of factors affecting quality of life can be created, and the way people weigh these factors differs.

=== Quality of Life ===
- 6th in the UK for quality of life, according to a rating of the UK's 12 largest cities. The cities were assessed on a range of factors including property market activity, rental costs, salary levels, disposable income growth, cost of living, unemployment rates and life satisfaction.
- 51st best city in the world to live in according to the Economist Intelligence Unit in 2012, in a study which looks at crime levels, education, health care, culture and infrastructure. The survey only included two British cities (London and Manchester), and Manchester's decline of 9 places since the previous year follows the 2011 England Riots, and was greater than any of the 140 other cities worldwide except Damascus, which descended into civil war in 2011. Also ranked ahead of London in 2011, it was said the city ranks slightly ahead because it had better healthcare, whilst it was also considered to be a more "stable" city in terms of crime and terrorism.
- Europe's most affordable city featured, according to KPMG's Competitive Alternative 2012 report, ranking slightly better than Dutch cities, Rotterdam and Amsterdam, who all have a cost of living index less than 95.
- 4th most deprived Local Authority in England according to the 2010 Indices of Deprivation, which takes into account: income; employment; health and disability; education, skills and training; barriers to housing and services; crime; and living environment. There has been improvement since 2007; the number of Lower Super Output Areas in Manchester considered most deprived fell by 13%.
- 7th most congested city in Europe, 2nd in the UK after London, according to NAVTEQ's report on Europe's most congested cities.
- 4th most bike-friendly big city in the UK in 2010, after Bristol, Nottingham and Leicester.
- 5th best sports city in the world (2012) after London, Melbourne, Sydney and New York City according to a SportBusiness Group Ultimate Sports Cities report. The report noted that New York and Manchester enjoy the benefits of worldwide sports club brands and their social legacy, especially in the case of Manchester. Manchester has been shortlisted amongst 30 other cities for the 2014 top cities ranking.

=== Business ===
- 9th lowest tax cost of any industrialised city in the world in 2012 according to KPMG's Competitive Alternative report, where the report noted the city was a notable improver in competitiveness compared with other European cities, with currency depreciation, taxation reductions and decreased industrial facilities costs highlighted as factors.
- Along with London, Manchester featured in the top 30 cities in the world for investment, and of the top 30, Manchester was 12th for the highest proportion of urban economy derived from financial and business services.
- Manchester has also overtaken Stuttgart and Tokyo to rank 24th in the world, 2nd in the UK after London, in the global innovation cities league tables, according to the most recent 2thinknow Consulting report on Innovation Cities.

== GVA ==
GVA for Greater Manchester South 2002-2012
Year	GVA (£ million)	Growth (%)
2002	24,011	▲3.8%
2003	25,063	▲4.4%
2004	27,862	▲11.2%
2005	28,579	▲2.6%
2006	30,384	▲6.3%
2007	32,011	▲5.4%
2008	32,081	▲0.2%
2009	33,186	▲3.4%
2010	33,751	▲1.7%
2011	33,468	▼0.8%
2012	34,755	▲3.8%

The Office for National Statistics does not produce GVA data for the City of Manchester alone, instead the sub-region of Greater Manchester (GM) is divided into two groups of authorities to form NUTS 3 areas for statistical purposes:
Greater Manchester South (Manchester, Salford, Stockport, Tameside, Trafford)
Greater Manchester North (Bolton, Bury, Oldham, Rochdale, Wigan)

Manchester can only be analysed alongside neighbouring metropolitan boroughs within GM South, which tend to have high levels of economic coherence nevertheless; for example, Salford Central railway station is less than 150 meters (170 yards) away from the boundary of Manchester city centre whilst Salford itself has no identifiable city centre.

In 2012, Greater Manchester South's GVA was £34.8bn ($61.5bn), accounting for 68.2% of the GVA of the Greater Manchester, 26.6% of the GVA of the North West and 2.5% of the GVA of the UK. Compared with other NUTS 3 areas in the UK, the economy of Greater Manchester South is exceeded only by London (comprising five NUTS 3 areas - £309.3bn), and annual GVA growth was 3.8% vs. the Core Cities average of 2%.^{1}

Total GVA and GVA per head, 2012
Area	GVA (£ million)	GVA growth (%); 2011-12	GVA (£ per head)	GVA per head growth (%); 2011-12
GM South	34,755	▲3.8%	23,476	▲2.9%
Greater Manchester	50,991	▲3.1%	18,870	▲2.5%
Core Cities average^{1}	13,752	▲2.0%	22,452	▲1.0%

^{1}excluding Manchester, included Newcastle, Liverpool, Sheffield, Leeds, Nottingham, Bristol and Birmingham

=== Productivity ===
GVA per employee in Greater Manchester South is estimated to be £46,500 in 2012. Compared with other NUTS 3 city areas in the UK, Greater Manchester South ranks 4th, behind London (£75,100), Edinburgh (£54,100) and Leeds (£46,900).

GVA per employee, 2012
Area	GVA per worker (£)	GVA per worker % change 2007-12
GM South	46,500	▲12%
Core Cities average^{2}	40,100	▲10.1%

^{2}excluding Manchester, included Newcastle, Liverpool, Sheffield, Leeds, Nottingham, Bristol and Birmingham

=== GVA by sector ===
Industry breakdown, 2011
Sector	Value (£ millions)	Growth 2010–11 (%)	% of total
Agriculture, forestry and fishing	25	▼8.0	<0.1
Production	3,441	▼1.8	10.3
of which manufacturing	2,711	▲1.5	8.1
Construction	1,688	▼3.5	5.0
Distribution; transport; accommodation and food	6,613	▼3.1	19.8
Information and communication	1,828	▲0.2	5.5
Financial and insurance services	3,217	▼15.9	9.6
Real estate activities	4,192	▲13.1	12.5
Business service activities	4,652	▲15.9	13.9
Public administration, education and health	6,563	▼0.9	19.6
Other services and household activities	1,248	▼5.0	3.7
Total	33,468	▼0.8	

== GDP ==
According to Office for National Statistics figures, Manchester's nominal GDP per capita was £35,864 in 2011 and rose to £65,591 in 2023, representing a 83% increase. Adjusted for inflation, the figures were £22,174 in 2011 and 35,255 in 2023 in 2022 fixed prices—representing a 58% real increase, the greatest inflation-adjusted growth of any British city and third-greatest of any statistical region, behind only Berkshire West and Hackney & Newham. For context, the UK economy as a whole grew by only 20% between 2011 and 2023.

In 2023, Greater Manchester had a total nominal GDP of 110 billion, accounting for approximately 41% of the GDP of the North West. This made it the biggest urban contributor to national GDP behind London. Its GDP was slightly larger than the combined GDP of Wales, which stood at c. £93 billion, and compared to €248 billion (£215 billion) for Dublin, £617 billion for Greater London and €860 billion (£745 billion) for the Paris metropolitan region (Île-de-France).

== Employment, welfare and education ==
The mid-year estimate for the population of Manchester was 510,800 in 2012 and population growth on the previous year was 1.56%, the second highest of the Core Cities after Nottingham. An estimated 6,402,684 people lived within 30 miles of Manchester, and 11,472,603 within 50 miles. The 2011 Census also showed that between 2001 and 2011, the population of Manchester grew 19%, making it the fastest growing area in the UK outside London. Whilst the population of Manchester grew more than both Birmingham and Liverpool combined, there has also been a reversal of the traditional brain drain to the South, where some 1,600 people moved from London to Manchester in 2010.

=== Employment ===
Employment statistics (Jul 12-Jun 13)
Age 16-64	Manchester (%)	North West (%)	Great Britain (%)
Economically active	69.4	75.4	77.3
In employment	60.8	69.1	71.1
Unemployed	11.9	8.2	7.8
% of economically active who are self-employed	6.4	8.4	9.5

It would appear that Manchester has a high rate of economic inactivity, however Manchester has an above average student population size, where 39.5% of those economically inactive are students vs. the British average of 25.4%.

=== Earnings ===
Earnings by workplace^{2} 2013
Full-time workers	Manchester (£)	North West (£)	Great Britain (£)
Weekly pay (all workers)	524.9	480.5	517.8
Male	570.8	516.9	558.3
Female	485.8	432.2	459.6
Gender pay gap	14.9%	16.4%	17.7%
Hourly pay (all workers)	13.89	12.25	13.17
Male	14.48	12.73	13.80
Female	13.26	11.56	12.27
Gender pay gap	8.4%	9.2%	11.1%

Earnings by residence^{1} 2013
Full-time workers	Manchester (£)	North West (£)	Great Britain (£)
Weekly pay (all workers)	461.6	483.2	518.1
Male	478.5	519.4	558.8
Female	432.8	432.2	459.8
Gender pay gap	9.6%	16.8%	17.7%
Hourly pay (all workers)	12.15	12.34	13.18
Male	12.23	12.84	13.80
Female	11.83	11.59	12.27
Gender pay gap	3.3%	9.7%	11.1%

^{1}Median earnings in pounds for employees living in the area.

^{2}Median earnings in pounds for employees working in area.

=== Education ===
Qualifications 2012
Level	Manchester (%)	North West (%)	Great Britain (%)
NVQ4 and above	37.4	30.3	34.4
NVQ3 and above	56.0	52.0	55.1
NVQ2 and above	69.1	69.9	71.8
NVQ1 and above	79.5	83.1	84.0
Other qualifications	7.3	5.8	6.3
No qualifications	13.3	11.1	9.7

General Certificate of Secondary Education (GCSE) 2012
	Manchester (%)	England (%)
Pupils achieving 5+ GCSEs, A*-C	81.3	81.8
Pupils achieving 5+ GCSEs, A*-C with English and Maths	53.2	59.4
Pupils achieving no GCSEs	1.6	0.5

== Business activity ==
As the UK economy continued to recover from the downturn experienced in 2008–10, Manchester compared favourably to other areas. It achieved the strongest annual growth in business stock (of 5%) of all the Core Cities. The city experienced a relatively sharp increase in the number of business deaths, the largest increase of all the Core Cities; however this was offset by strong growth in new businesses which resulted in a strong net growth.

Business Demography, 2012
Area	Business Stock	Births	Deaths	5 year survival rates
Area	(% annual changes)			5 year survival rates
Manchester	▲5.0%	▲6.5%	18.2%	41.5%
Greater Manchester	▲1.2%	▲2.5%	9.5%	42.4%
Core Cities average	▲3.1%	▲6.2%	4.3%	40.4%

=== Headquarters ===
Manchester is a major headquarters location, with a growing number of global, European and national headquarter offices. International property experts Cushman & Wakefield have ranked Manchester as the best city to locate a new headquarters operation largely down to ease of access to a pool of knowledge and global connectivity. Companies with global headquarters in Manchester include Umbro, PZ Cussons, and The Co-Operative Group. Manchester is also the European headquarters for companies like Brother and UAE firm Etihad Airways. Kellogg's, Adidas, Siemens and Totesport are amongst hundreds of firms with national headquarters in Manchester. Well Pharmacy is based in Central Manchester and the largest pharmaceutical company based in the North of England.

Manchester's ability to host major headquarter offices has been recently proven by the action taken by the BBC to move significant parts of its operation to MediaCityUK on the banks of the Manchester Ship Canal in Salford and Trafford, by the growth of shared service centres for Sainsbury's, Marks & Spencer and the Royal Bank of Scotland, and by the presence foreign language back-office teams serving more than 20 different markets.

=== Logistics ===
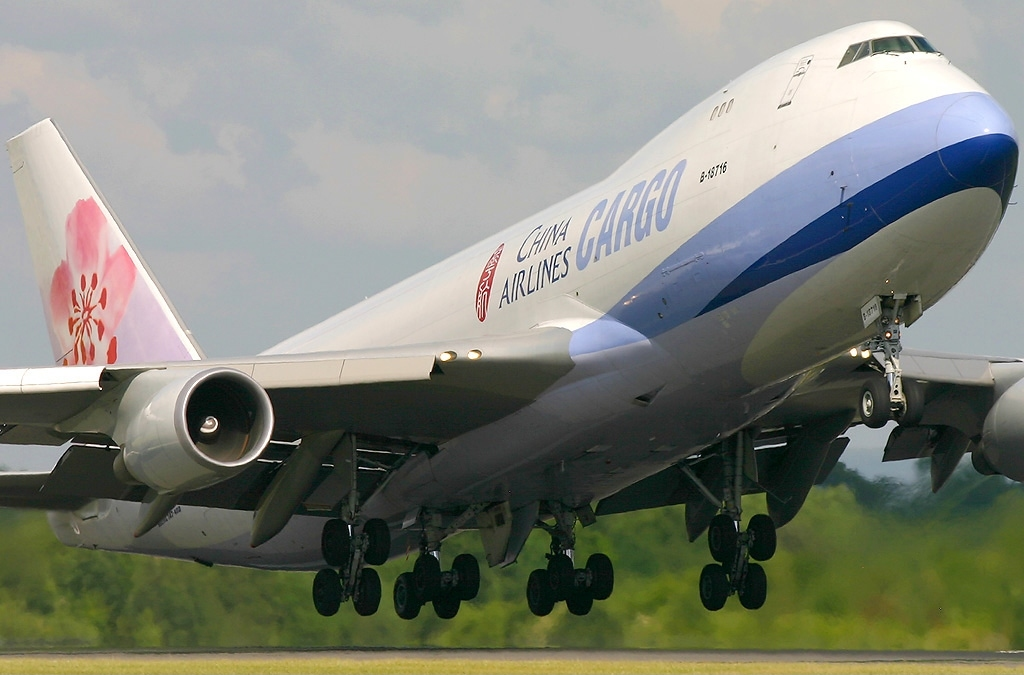
China Airlines Cargo Boeing 747-400F departs Manchester Airport.

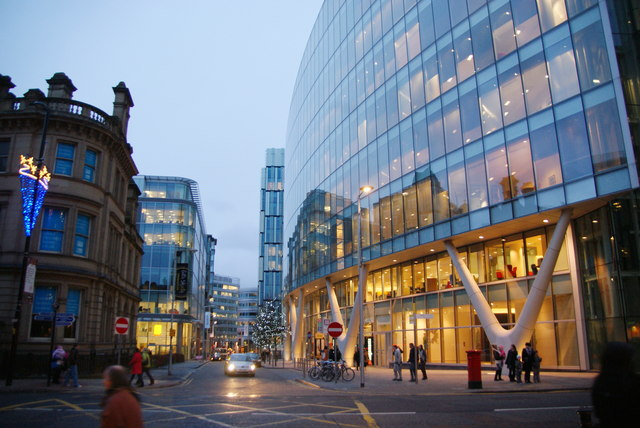
Spinningfields with the Royal Bank of Scotland (right)

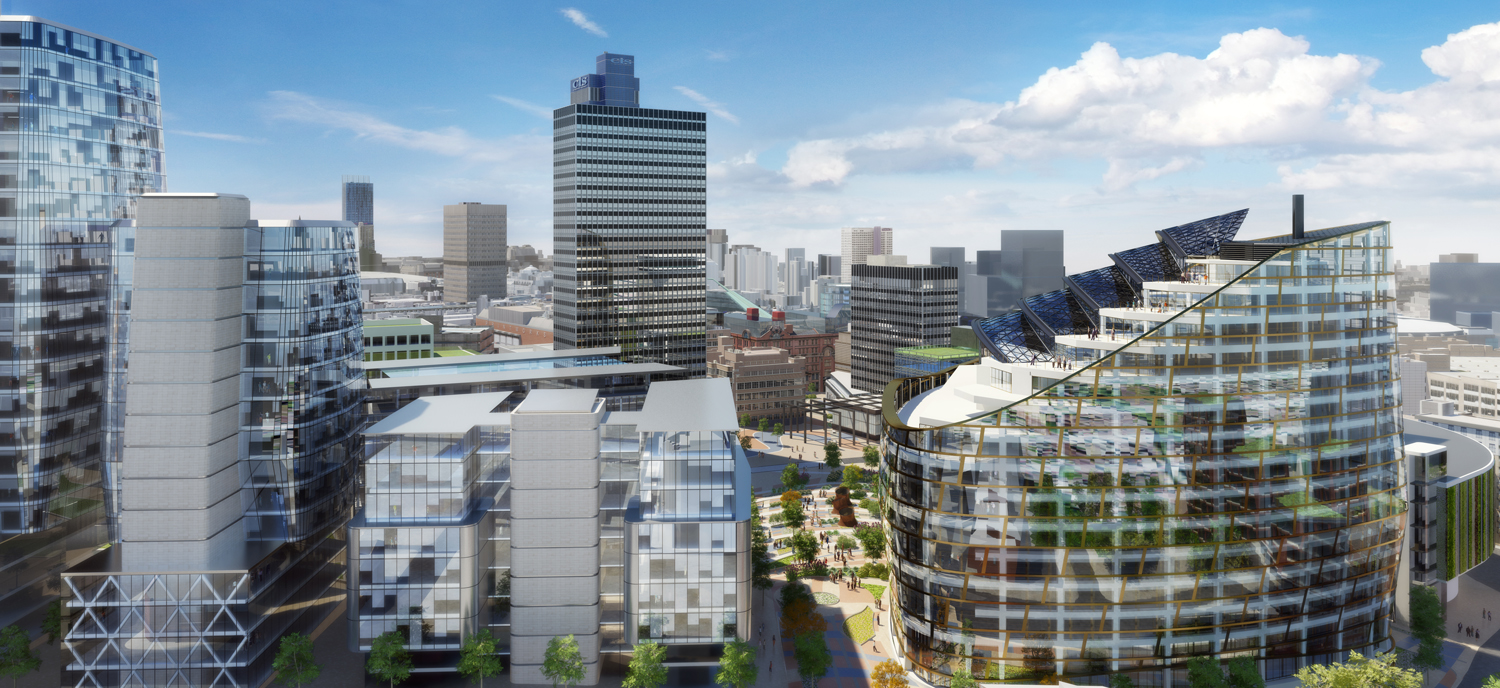
The Co-Operative Group's NOMA development currently under construction

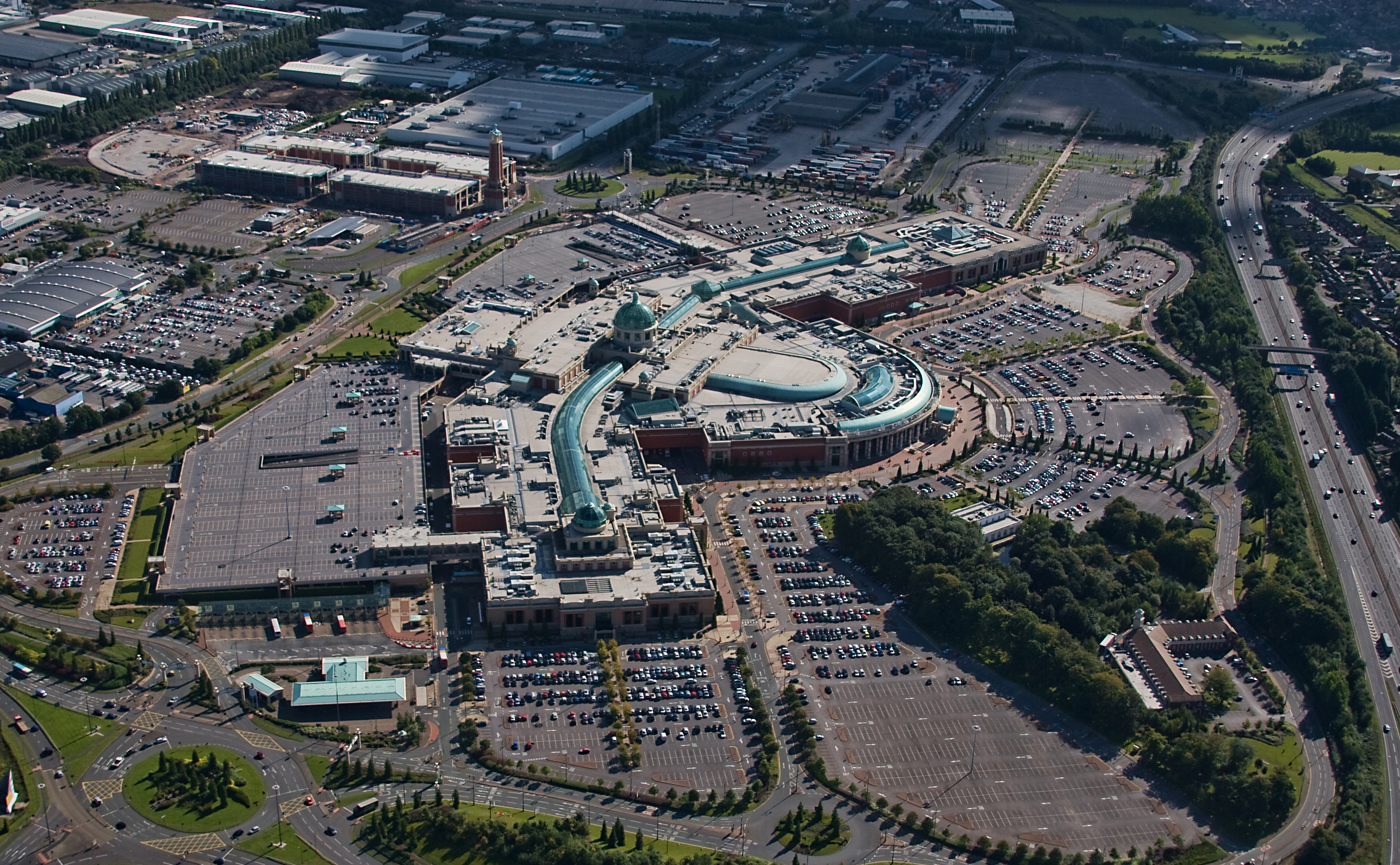
The Trafford Centre is the 3rd largest shopping centre in the UK.

Manchester is the preferred distribution hub for global companies like Adidas, Argos, Kellogg's, L'Oreal, Office Depot, Procter and Gamble; and major logistics firms such as Kuehne & Nagel and Wincanton. Manchester is centrally located and has more motorways than any other UK city. Every major population centre from Edinburgh to London can be reached within a four-hour drive; and 60% of UK companies are within a two-hour drive.

Manchester Airport is home to the World Freight Terminal, the fifth busiest in the UK behind Heathrow, East Midlands Airport, Gatwick and Stansted, where cargo Airlines such as Cathay Pacific Cargo, China Airlines Cargo, Lufthansa Cargo and FedEx Express serve global destinations from Manchester. Following the decision by Beijing Engineering Construction Group to invest in Manchester's Airport City, freight and distribution firm DHL has agreed to relocate major operations to the site.

Trafford Park, is the world's first planned industrial estate, and remains the largest in Europe. The site is also home to Trafford Park EuroTerminal, a rail freight terminal and a large container depot. Future enhancements of the site are entailed in the proposed £50 billion Atlantic Gateway, which could be one of the most expensive and expansive development projects in UK history. It would involve the creation of Port Salford, an inland freight terminal accessible to the Irish Sea via the Manchester Ship Canal.

=== Banking, finance and insurance ===
The Manchester city region accounts for 7% of all financial services output and 10% of all employment in the UK, and over 60 banks have operations in Manchester, 40 of which are overseas-owned, making it the largest regional corporate finance and stockbroking centre in England. In 2011, Manchester's financial and insurance sector was worth £3.22 billion, the 3rd largest in the United Kingdom after London and Edinburgh. The city also had the sixth-largest number of employees employed in the financial and insurance sector in the United Kingdom, with more than 96,300 people employed in banking, finance and insurance, translating to 31.4% of all employees, the 2nd highest rate of all the Core Cities after Bristol. Of all the 10 largest financial centres in the UK, only Manchester and Cardiff have maintained financial sector employment levels, whilst other cities sustained heavy job losses in recent years.

Some notable operations in the city include the Royal Bank of Scotland, who employ 7,000 people in Manchester following a rising trend in nearshoring from London. The Co-operative Group, the world's largest consumer-owned business with large banking and insurance operations was founded in Manchester in 1844. The group's headquarters have been in Manchester ever since, and its new £100 million headquarters, with One Angel Square recently declared the greenest building on earth. The Bank of New York Mellon opened its Manchester headquarters in 2005, and since then has expanded to over 1,100 employees and added a second office in Spinningfields. The bank describes Manchester as one of its "three global growth centres", with the office handling £15 billion worth of transactions across 80 global money markets every day.

Spinningfields is a large new business district west of Deansgate that will serve as home to several headquarters, squares, and cafes. The first building on the site was the Royal Bank of Scotland's new headquarters. Some have speculated that Spinningfields is fast becoming the Canary Wharf of the North, with the Financial Times noting, "London has Canary Wharf and Paris has La Défense, Manchester has its own modern financial centre in the form of Spinningfields". As well as Bank of New York Mellon and the Royal Bank of Scotland, Spinningfields is the location for other banks including Barclays and HSBC, and other professional services firms such as Deloitte.

Assets which contribute to the success of Manchester's Corporate services sector include a pool of 30,000 new graduates each year from the city's universities, and Manchester Business School, which has a strong international reputation with global 1st-place rankings in some categories. The city also benefits with links to world leading financial centres, with direct flights to New York City, Frankfurt, Geneva and Singapore. There are high-speed trains to London every 20 minutes, and multiple shuttle flights to London Heathrow Airport. The Lord Mayor of the City of London once said "Manchester is part of the Square Mile and the Square Mile is part of Manchester".

=== Construction ===
The city and Greater Manchester region have benefited from large-scale developments such as the ongoing Metrolink expansion, the £650m MediaCityUK development and the largest development in the UK, NOMA, at a cost of £800m. Future developments include the £800m Manchester Airport City, which will be the largest UK development project since the London 2012 Olympics, the Etihad Campus project in conjunction with Manchester City F.C. and the £50 billion Atlantic Gateway project which aims to reinvigorate the Manchester Ship Canal. The University of Manchester is also investing £1 billion in developing its campus over the next decade.

=== Retail ===
The pedestrianised Market Street forms the core of the city centre's retail area. It is dominated on the north side by the Manchester Arndale and a branch of Debenhams. The city centre also has smaller centres including The Triangle, which caters to youthful and upmarket clientele, and the Royal Exchange Centre. The Shambles includes Harvey Nichols, Marks & Spencer, and Selfridges stores, as well as a number of designer boutiques. Overall, Manchester has the highest number of "premium retailers" and in 2010 turnover in Manchester city centre was £921m.

Deansgate also has many shops, including department store House of Fraser (formerly Kendals), along with pubs and bars. King Street is an affluent shopping area with exclusive fashion brand stores, as well as many notable buildings preserved in a conservation area. Other hubs in the centre include St Ann's Square, and Exchange Square.

Former stores include Lewis's, Henry's, and Affleck and Brown (now Affleck's Palace).

There are various markets held regularly within the city. In the run up to Christmas, the Manchester Christmas Markets take over Albert Square, St. Ann's Square and surrounding streets. It started as a traditional German/French Christmas market, hence the large number of Glühwein & sausage stalls. This has grown year on year and boasts an increasingly wide range of stalls from Western Europe (such as the Netherlands, Italy, Spain). The markets provide food and drink into the evening extending the use of the city centre and lending a friendly spirit to Christmas shopping.

== Infrastructure ==
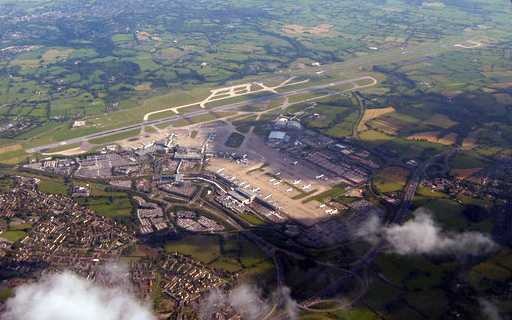
Manchester Airport

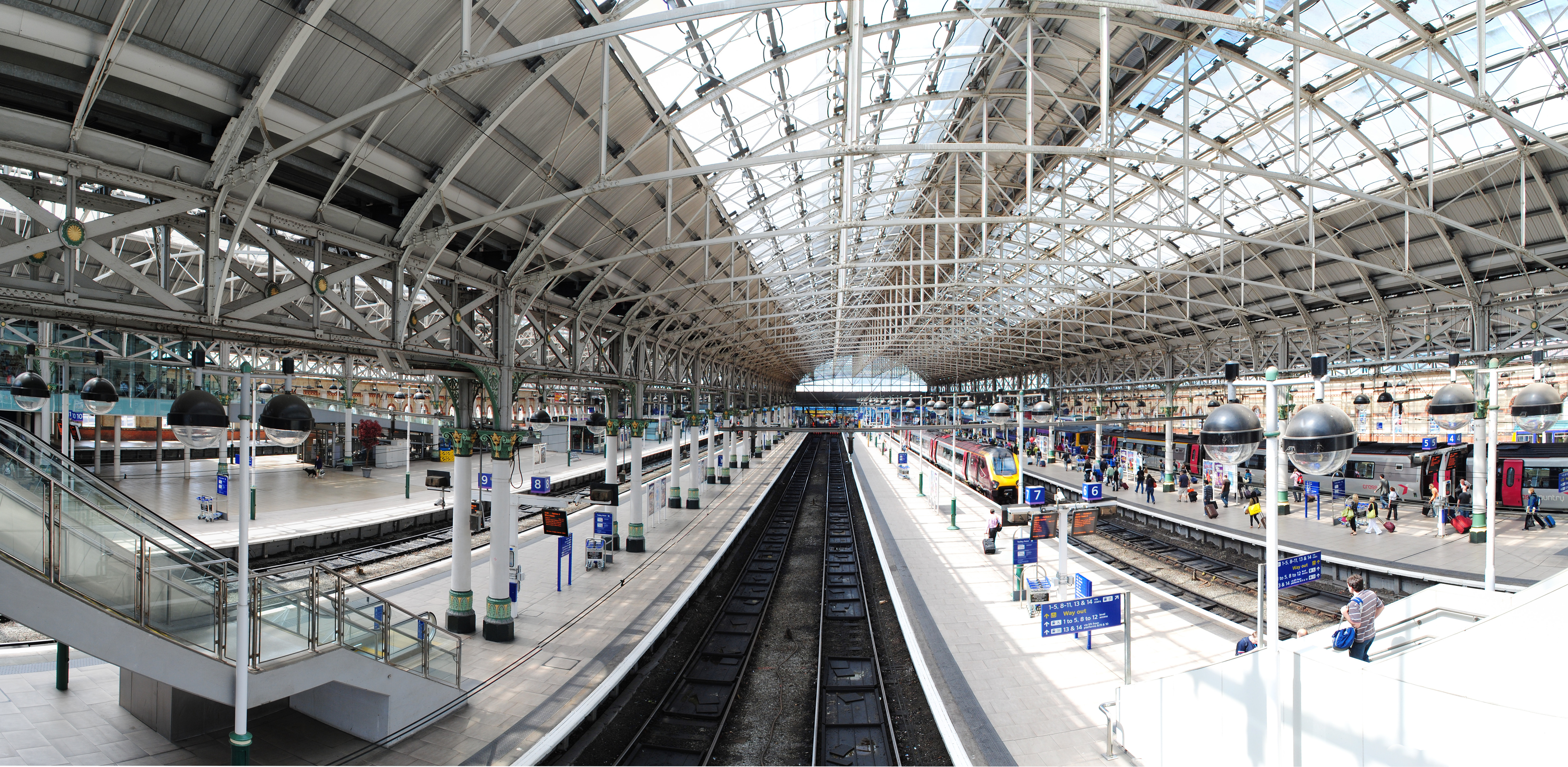
Manchester Piccadilly station

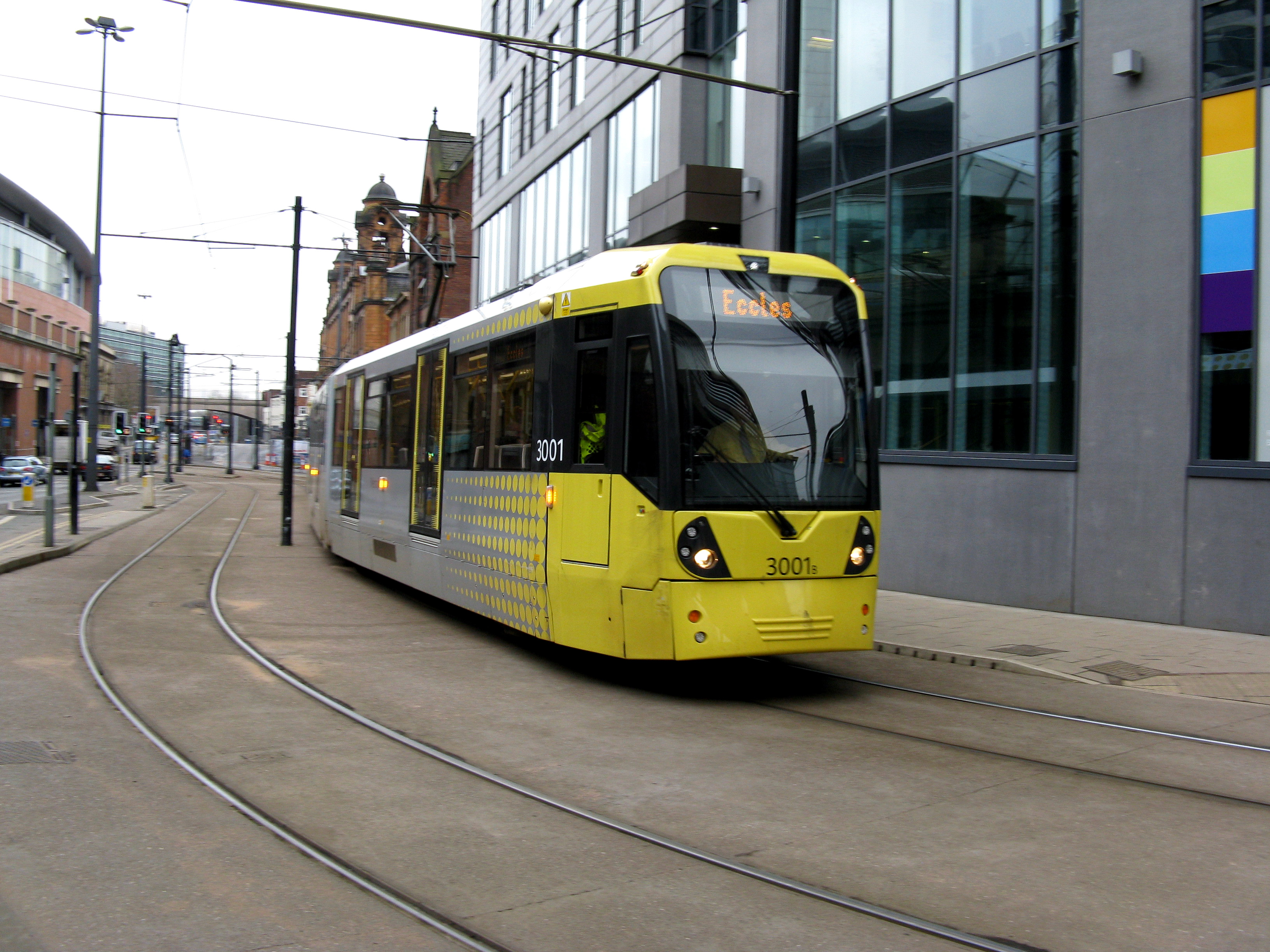
The Manchester Metrolink will have the largest tram system in the UK once expansion is complete.

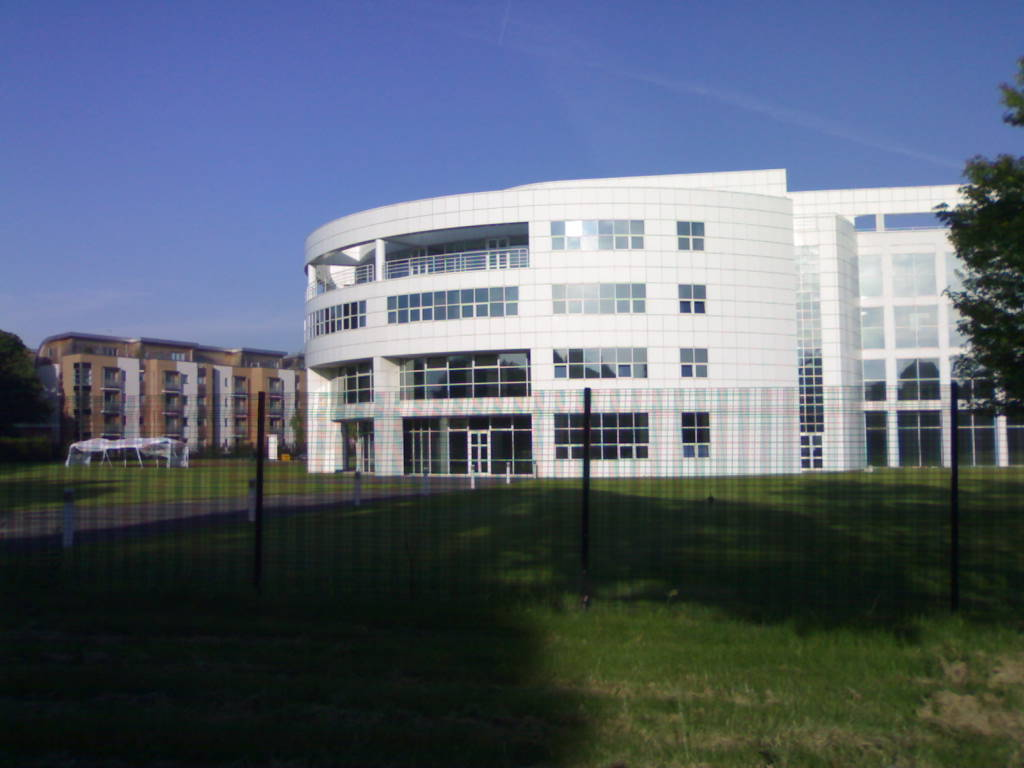
Sir William Siemens House on Princess Road, West Didsbury. It is head office for Siemens Automation and Drives.

Manchester is regarded as the North's only major international gateway, with a multimodal integrated transport network. The Manchester city region was ranked in the top 10 in Europe for transport links by Cushman & Wakefield's European cities monitor 2011.

=== Air ===
Manchester Airport is the third largest airport in the UK behind Heathrow and Gatwick, handling more than 20.5 million passengers between 2012–13, which is more than double the number of annual passengers of the next busiest non-London airport. It is also the fastest growing airport after Heathrow and Gatwick, with an annual growth of 9.1% between 2012-13. Manchester airport serves over 200 destinations, more than any other airport in the UK, and only Amsterdam Schiphol Airport serves more foreign destinations in the global league table. Daily services fly to Europe, North America, Africa, the Middle-East and the Far-East, and the airport has been awarded the UK's best airport every year from 2008 to 2012.

The airport is owned by a public sector controlled holding company, Manchester Airports Group. Manchester City Council has a majority 35.5% stake with 45% owned by the nine boroughs of Greater Manchester who all have a 5% stake and the rest by private investors. The airport employs approximately 19,000 people.

=== Rail ===
Manchester is served by four stations in the city centre; Manchester Piccadilly (18.5 million passengers), Manchester Victoria (9.8 million passengers), Manchester Oxford Road (8.3 million passengers) and Deansgate (0.35 million passengers), which form the Manchester station group with a combined passenger usage of 37 million passengers in 2011-12. Manchester will be at the heart of the £560 million Northern Hub development, which will see all four Manchester stations connected, increased electrification of networks, increased frequencies and reduced journey times between Northern cities.

Under government plans, Manchester Piccadilly will be connected to London Euston via High Speed 2, a high-speed railway, by 2033. Trains will also stop at Manchester Airport. Journey times from Manchester to London are expected to reduce from 2h:08m to 1h:08m.

=== Local transport ===
The city is served by the UK's largest light rail network, the Metrolink, which stretches from Bury, Oldham and Rochdale in the north to Salford, Eccles to the west, Manchester Airport and Altrincham in the south and Ashton-under-Lyne to the east. The most recent expansion of the Metrolink service to Trafford Park and the Trafford Centre opened in March 2020. The network serves key destinations including MediaCityUK, Chorlton, the Etihad Stadium, East Didsbury, Central Park and Kingsway Business Park.

The city's bus services, GM Buses, were demerged in 1996 with Stagecoach Group gaining control of GM South bus services and First Bus gaining control of GM North bus services. Stagecoach Manchester is Stagecoach Group's largest subsidiary carrying over 87 million passengers a year and employing 1,700 staff. First Greater Manchester also operate a thorough bus service in Manchester alongside Stagecoach.

=== Technology ===
Manchester is the only city in the UK to offer next generation fibre optic broadband speeds up to 200 Mbit/s, and serves as a testbed for new technologies. In MediaCityUK, download speeds reach 10 gigabits/second. Being at a central location in the UK, all primary telecom carriers and fibre optic networks converge through Manchester, making it a principal access point for the North of England. MaNAP - Manchester Network Access Point - is a major internet traffic hub mainly serving the Midlands and North of England, and is the only access point outside London, offering access to world networks at a much lower cost than through London.

Manchester is at the forefront of cloud computing, with companies such as Cisco, Oracle and EMC all located in the city, and IBM is currently developing virtualised environments for cloud computing in their Manchester research laboratory. Outsourcery, the UK's leading provider of cloud computing solutions and mobile-centric Unified Communications to SMEs, is headquartered in Manchester. Several hosting and colocation providers such as UKFast, Daisy Group and Datacentreplus have invested in new data centres in Manchester to support cloud computing.

Manchester is also home to a growing community of digital companies, specialising in fields as diverse as SEO (search engine optimisation), web design and online PR. The rise of Manchester's digital commerce scene is evidenced by the establishment of its own online hub Manchester Digital, along with websites aimed at bringing together companies and individuals involved in more specific fields, such as SEO.

== Tourism ==
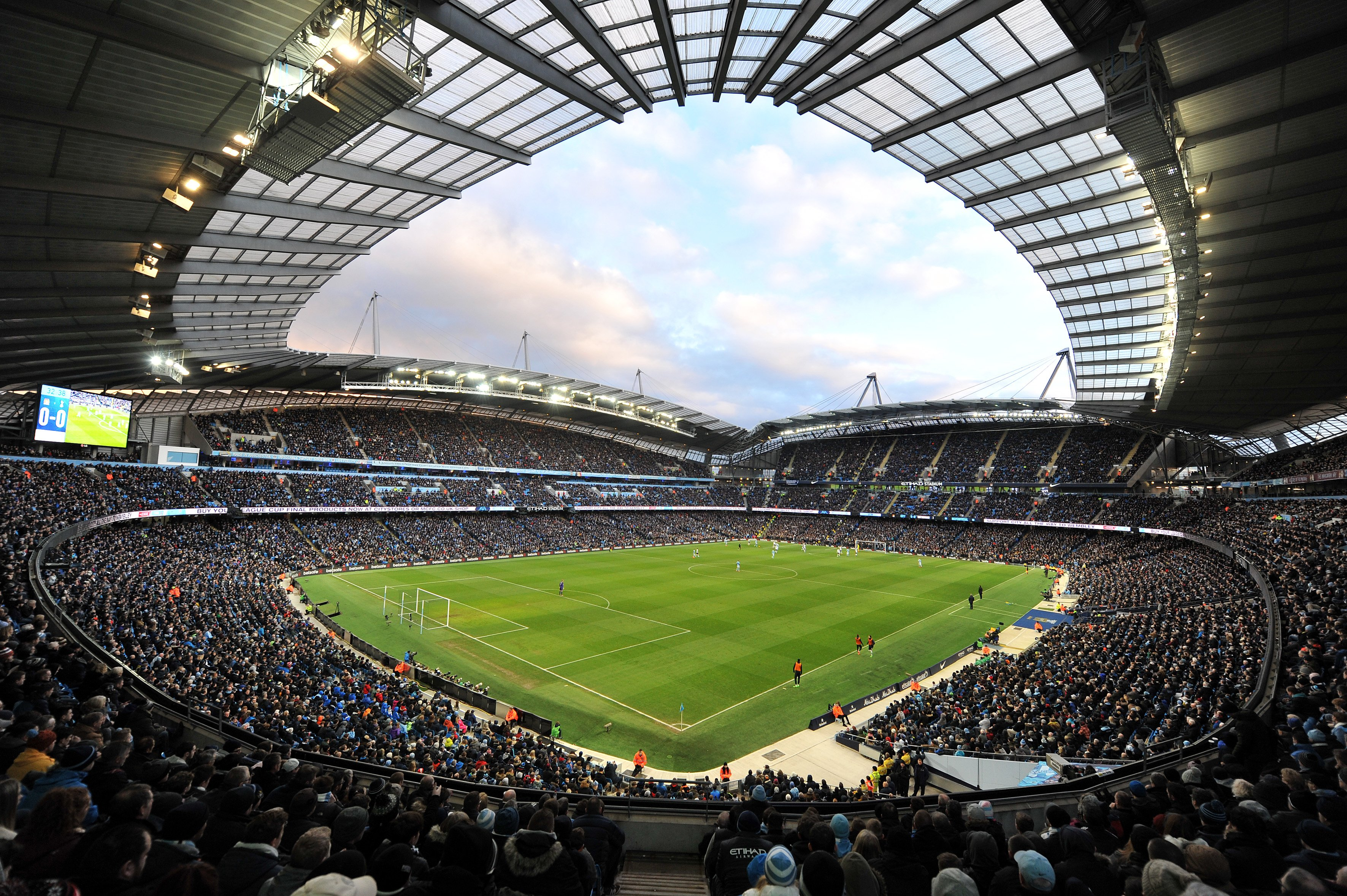
The City of Manchester Stadium which hosted the 2002 Commonwealth Games

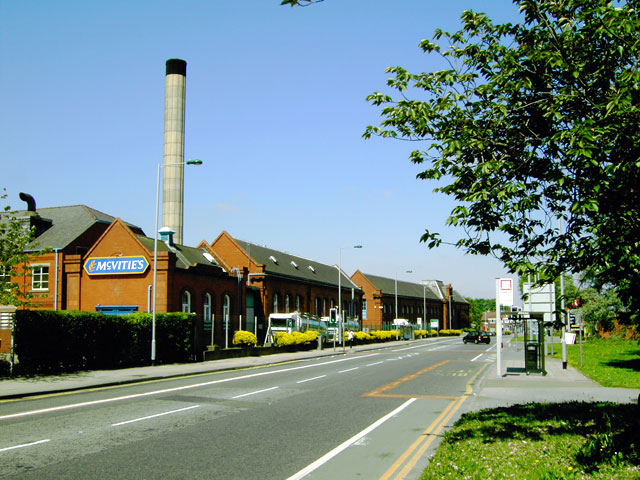
McVitie's factory on Stockport Road

Manchester is the second most visited city in England (after London) and the third most visited in the United Kingdom (behind Edinburgh).

Visit Manchester is the tourist board for the city-region and is a division of Marketing Manchester, which was established in 1996. It is the agency charged with promoting the city of Manchester on a national and international stage. The organisation aims to develop the Manchester city-region into a leading leisure, learning and business destination for domestic and international visitors, enhance the national and international reputation of the city-region and promote sustainable economic development and growth.

== Sport ==
The city has links with Umbro and Reebok, both companies were founded nearby in Wilmslow and Bolton respectively. Another major sports apparel company, Adidas, has its UK head office in Stockport and its national distribution warehouse in nearby Trafford Park - both sites total 60% of Adidas's UK workforce.

Manchester is also popularly known for its major football clubs, Manchester City and Manchester United, both have a combined revenue of €1,213.9m (Manchester City - €524.9m and Manchester United - €689m). Both clubs' popularity makes Manchester the richest footballing city in the UK by revenue. Only London, with three clubs (€1,195.6m - total revenue of Chelsea F.C., Arsenal F.C. and Tottenham Hotspur) can boast comparable figures according to the 2015-16 Deloitte Money League table.

== Food and drink ==
Manchester has a range of restaurants, bars, and clubs, spanning the famous "Curry Mile" in Rusholme to traditional ‘grub’. The city has a Chinatown area.

The city is also home to some famous food manufacturing companies. Kellogg's have based their European headquarters in Trafford Park since 1937. McVitie's also has a key production site in Stockport Road where it has been based since 1917.

== See also ==
- Manchester Independent Economic Review
