= Economy of Birmingham =

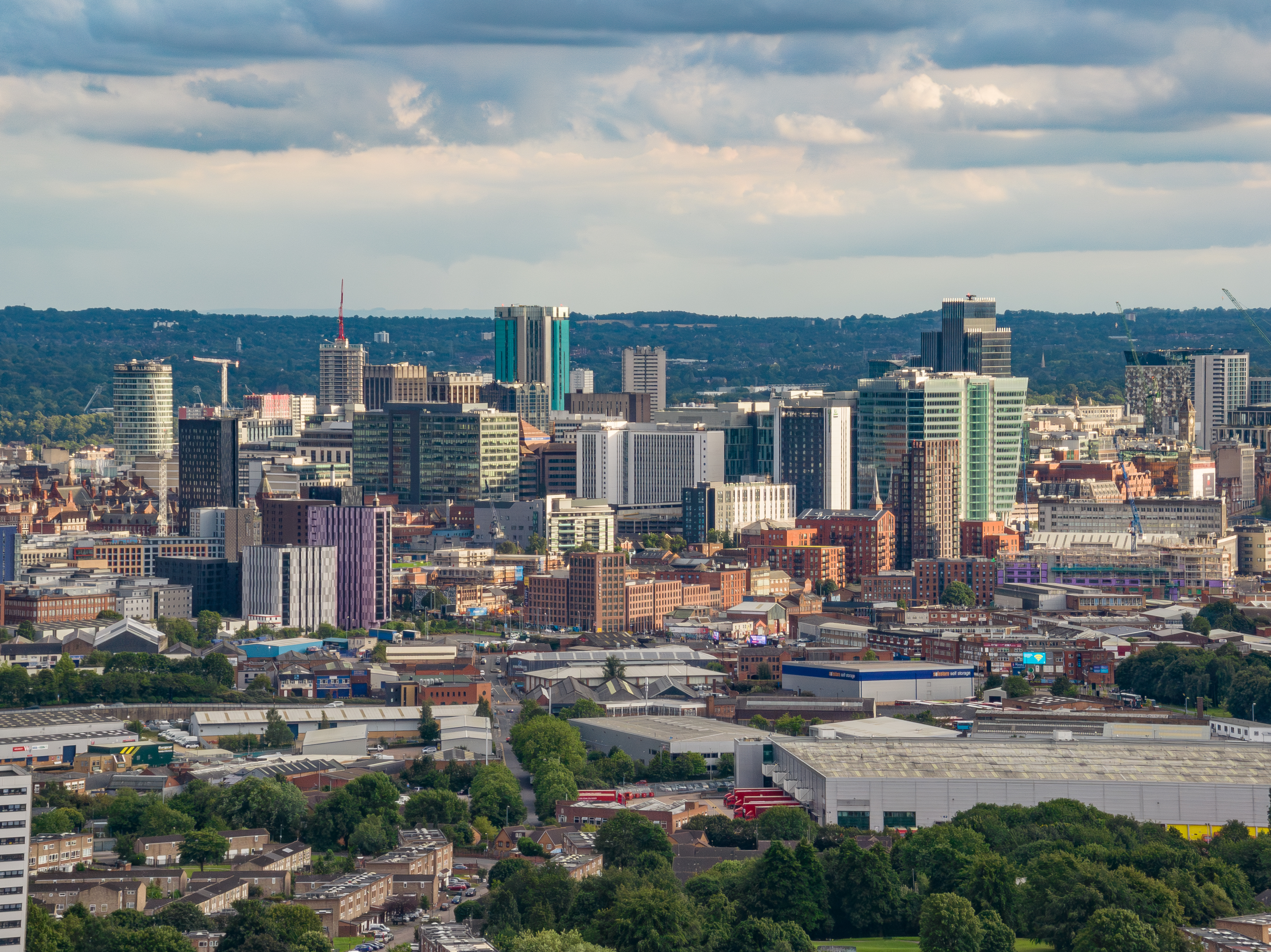
- Skyline of Birmingham

Statistics
- Population: 1,166,049 (2023)
- GDP: £38.9 billion (2023)
- GDP per capita: £33,362 (2023)

The economy of Birmingham, England, is an important manufacturing and engineering centre, employing over 100,000 people in the industry and contributing billions of pounds to the national economy. During 2013, the West Midlands region as a exported goods worth £19.6 billion, around 8.73% of the national total.

The economy of Birmingham is dominated by the service sector, which accounted for 88% of the city's employment in 2012. In 2023, the median salary for full-time employees in Birmingham was £34,037, with an unemployment rate of 7.7%.

Birmingham is the largest centre in Great Britain for employment in public administration, education and health; and after Leeds the second-largest centre outside London for employment in financial and other business services.

The wider metropolitan economy is the second-largest in the United Kingdom with a GDP of $121.1 billion (2014 estimate, PPP). Major companies headquartered in Birmingham include the engineering company IMI plc, Mobico Group, Patisserie Valerie, Claire's, and Mitchells & Butlers; including the wider metropolitan area, the city has the largest concentration of major companies outside London and the South East. hosting headquarters for Gymshark and Severn Trent Water. With major facilities such as the National Exhibition Centre and International Convention Centre, Birmingham attracts 42% of the UK's total conference and exhibition trade.

Birmingham was second only to London for the creation of new jobs between 1951 and 1961, and unemployment rarely exceeded 1% between 1948 and 1966. By 1961, household incomes in the West Midlands (county) were 13% above the national average, exceeding even London and the South East. In 2012, manufacturing accounted for 8% of the employment in Birmingham, a figure below the average for the UK as a whole. Major industrial plants in the city include Jaguar Land Rover in Castle Bromwich and Cadbury in Bournville, with large local producers also supporting a supply chain of precision-based small manufacturers and craft industries. More traditional industries also remain: 40% of the jewellery made in the UK is still produced by the 300 independent manufacturers of the city's Jewellery Quarter, continuing a trade first recorded in Birmingham in 1308.

Birmingham was also one of the founding cities for the Eurocities group and is also sitting as chair. Birmingham is considered to be a 'Beta-' global city, rated as the joint second most globally influential city in the UK after London. Birmingham has the second largest city economy in the UK after London and was ranked 72nd in the world in 2008. With 16,281 start-ups registered during 2013, Birmingham has the highest level of entrepreneurial activity outside London, while the number of registered businesses in the city grew by 8.1% during 2016. Birmingham was behind only London and Edinburgh for private sector job creation between 2010 and 2013.

== Economic indices ==
Below is a collection of economic indices featuring Birmingham. It is important to remember that while useful, surveys and indicators have limitations, and are at times subjective and incomplete. For example, no complete list of factors affecting the quality of life can be created, and the way people weigh these factors differs.

=== Quality of life ===
- 10th in the UK for quality of life (2013), according to a rating of the UK's 1st largest cities, ahead of Sheffield and Bradford who rank 11th and 12th respectively. The cities were assessed on a range of factors including property market activity, rental costs, salary levels, disposable income growth, cost of living, unemployment rates and life satisfaction.
- 52nd-most liveable city in the world in 2010, according to the Mercer Index of worldwide standards of living,
- 19th in the UK amongst big cities for 'cycle-friendliness' (2010).
- Overall 9th most deprived Local Authority in England according to the 2010 Indices of Deprivation, which takes into account: income; employment; health and disability; education, skills and training; barriers to housing and services; crime; and living environment.
- Most deprived Local Authority in England in terms of income deprivation.
- Most deprived Local Authority in England in terms of employment deprivation.

=== Business ===
Cushman & Wakefield European Cities Monitor (2010) – A survey based on the views of 500 European businesses of Europe's leading business cities.

- Overall 18th in Europe, 3rd in the UK after London and Manchester, best city to locate a business based on factors which are disaggregated below.
- 9th in Europe, 2nd in the UK after London, for ease of access to markets, customers or clients.
- 16th in Europe, 3rd in the UK after London and Manchester, for best-qualified staff.
- 15th in Europe, 3rd in the UK after London and Manchester, for quality of telecommunications.
- 11th in Europe, 3rd in the UK after London and Manchester, for external transport links to other cities and internationally.
- 5th in Europe, 3rd in the UK after Leeds and Glasgow, in terms of value for money of office space.
- 15th in Europe, 4th in the UK after Glasgow, Leeds and Manchester, for the cost of staff.
- 4th in Europe, 2nd in the UK after Manchester, for the availability of office space.
- 16th in Europe, 4th in the UK after London, Manchester and Glasgow, for climate governments create for businesses.
- 11th in Europe, 2nd in the UK after London, in terms of languages spoken.
- 18th in Europe, 4th in the UK after London, Manchester and Leeds for ease of travelling around within the city.

In the same survey, when asked how well companies know each of the cities as a business location, 28% said they were familiar with Birmingham as a business location. This was the third-highest in the UK after London (82%) and Manchester (33%).

== GVA ==
Nominal GVA for Birmingham 2008–2013. Note 2013 is provisional
Year	GVA (£ million)	Growth (%)
2008	21,015	Steady
2009	20,646	▼1.8%
2010	21,557	▲4.4%
2011	22,230	▲3.1%
2012	22,708	▲2.2%
2013	24,067	▲6.0%

In 2013, Birmingham's GVA was £24.1bn, accounting for 21.8% of the GVA of the West Midlands (region), and 1.6% of the GVA of the UK. Compared with other NUTS 3 city areas, its GVA is exceeded only by London (comprising five NUTS 3 areas – £309.3bn) and Greater Manchester South (£34.8bn).

Total GVA, 2013
Area	GVA (£ million)	GVA growth (%); 2012–13	GVA (£ per head)	GVA per head growth (%); 2012–13
Birmingham	24,067	▲6.0%	22,033	▲5.3%
West Midlands (region)	110,246	▲3.4%	19,428	▲2.8%
UK	1,525,304	▲3.4%	23,755	▲2.5%

The increase in GVA in 2013 was particularly strong when compared to previous years (increase in GVA of 2.2% in the period 2011–2012 for Birmingham).

=== Productivity ===
GVA per employee in Birmingham is estimated to be £42,800 in 2012. It is ranked 6th among the major cities and conurbations in the UK, and ranked 3rd among the Core Cities behind London (£75,100), Edinburgh (£54,100), Leeds (£46,900), Greater Manchester South (£46,500) and Glasgow (£44,700).

GVA per employee, 2012
Area	GVA per worker (£)	GVA per worker % change 2007–12
Birmingham	42,800	▲9%
Core Cities average^{2}	40,700	▲10.6%

^{2}excluding Birmingham, included Bristol, Leeds, Liverpool, Manchester, Newcastle, Nottingham and Sheffield

=== GVA by sector ===
Industry breakdown, 2012
Sector	Value (£ millions)	Growth 2011–12 (%)	% of total
Agriculture, forestry and fishing	4	▼20	0.02
Production	2,702	▼1	11.9
of which manufacturing	2,170	▼5	9.1
Construction	1,103	▼7	4.9
Distribution; transport; accommodation and food	3,936	▲12	17.3
Information and communication	776	▲2	3.4
Financial and insurance services	2,459	▼3	10.8
Real estate activities	2,998	▲9	13.2
Business service activities	2,643	▲4	11.6
Public administration, education and health	5,402	▼2	23.8
Other services and household activities	684	▲4	3.0
Total	22,708	▲2	

== GDP ==
According to the 2012 Eurostat figures, GDP per capita (in euros) of Greater Manchester is = €27,500 just ahead of the West-Midlands with €26,600 but only half the GDP per capita of Dublin €57,200 or London with €54,200.

Greater Manchester has a total GDP of €74.398 bn, West Midlands has a total GDP of €73.538 bn but less than the €85.700 bn in Greater Dublin and €450.379 bn in Greater London.

== Employment, welfare and education ==
The mid-year estimate for the population of Birmingham was 1,085,400 in 2012 and population growth was estimated to be 1.04%, the 4th highest of the Core Cities after Nottingham (1.59%), Manchester (1.56%) and Newcastle (1.2%).

=== Employment ===
Employment Statistics (Jul 2012 – Jun 2013)
Age 16–64	Birmingham (%)	West Midlands (%)	Great Britain (%)
Economically active	69.9	76.2	77.3
In employment	57.5	69.0	71.1
Unemployed	16.5	9.2	7.8
Economically active who are self-employed	7.1	8.8	9.5

=== Earnings ===
Earnings by residence^{1} 2013
Full-time workers	Birmingham (£)	West Midlands (£)	Great Britain (£)
Weekly pay (all workers)	478.6	483.0	518.1
Male	514.2	527.8	558.8
Female	423.5	421.5	459.8
Gender pay gap	17.6%	20.1%	17.7%
Hourly pay (all workers)	12.21	12.24	13.18
Male	12.61	12.88	13.80
Female	11.42	11.20	12.27
Gender pay gap	9.4%	13.0%	11.1%

^{1}Median earnings in pounds for employees living in Birmingham

Earnings by workplace^{2} 2013
Full-time workers	Birmingham (£)	West Midlands (£)	Great Britain (£)
Weekly pay (all workers)	518.6	484.6	517.8
Male	568.3	527.0	558.3
Female	453.3	417.1	459.6
Gender pay gap	20.2%	20.9%	17.7%
Hourly pay (All workers)	13.46	12.24	13.17
Male	14.27	12.90	13.80
Female	12.26	11.17	12.27
Gender pay gap	14.1%	13.4%	11.1%

^{2}Median earnings in pounds for employees working in Birmingham.

=== Education ===
General Certificate of Secondary Education (GCSE) 2012
	Birmingham (%)	England (%)
Pupils achieving 5+ GCSEs, A*-C	88.1	81.8
Pupils achieving 5+ GCSEs, A*-C with English and Maths	60.1	59.4
Pupils achieving no GCSEs	0.8	0.5

Qualifications 2012
Level	Birmingham (%)	West Midlands (%)	Great Britain (%)
NVQ4 and above	27.6	27.8	34.4
NVQ3 and above	46.9	48.4	55.1
NVQ2 and above	62.9	66.6	71.8
NVQ1 and above	75.5	79.5	84.0
Other qualifications	8.6	6.9	6.3
No qualifications	15.9	13.6	9.7

== Business activity ==
As the UK economy continues to recover from the downturn experienced in 2008–10, Birmingham has underperformed relative to other Core Cities, where a change in business stock was 1.6% compared to 3.6% for the Core Cities average. However, the underlying data showed that Birmingham had a high entrepreneurial activity with high levels of business start-ups, but this was offset by a relatively high number of business deaths.

Business Demography, 2012
Area	Business Stock	Births	Deaths	5 year survival rates
Area	% annual change			5 year survival rates
Birmingham	▲1.6%	▲6.8%	9.3%	39.8%
West Midlands	▲0.9%	▲3.9%	7.7%	40.7%
Core Cities average^{3}	▲3.6%	▲6.2%	5.6%	40.6%

^{3}excluding Birmingham, included Bristol, Leeds, Liverpool, Manchester, Newcastle, Nottingham and Sheffield

== Jewellery Quarter ==
The Jewellery Quarter is the largest concentration of dedicated jewellers in Europe. One-third of the jewellery manufactured in the UK is made within one mile of Birmingham city centre. Until 2003, coins for circulation were manufactured in the Jewellery Quarter at the Birmingham Mint, the oldest independent mint in the world, which continues to produce commemorative coins and medals.

== From manufacturing to service and research ==
As with most of the British and English economy, manufacturing in Birmingham has declined in importance since the 1970s, and it now employs a minority of the workforce. In recent years Birmingham's economy has diversified into service industries, retailing, knowledge and tourism, which are now the main employers in the city.

Today the city's products include luxury motor vehicles, vehicle components and accessories, weapons, electrical equipment, plastics, machine tools, chemicals, food, jewellery and glass. Birmingham is home to two major car factories, MG Rover in Longbridge and Jaguar in Castle Bromwich (and Land Rovers are manufactured in neighbouring Solihull). There are also other factories like at Autodesk that are important as smaller factories.

== Retail ==
Birmingham is home to one of the largest shopping centres in the UK and Europe, the Bullring. It is also the busiest in the UK, attracting 36.5 million visitors in its first year. Birmingham is the most visited retail destination outside London and the retail sector makes up a large proportion of the city's economy.

The city centre currently has three major shopping centres the Bullring, Mailbox, Grand Central and the Fort in Castle Vale as well as several smaller arcades and precincts and four department stores Selfridges, Debenhams, House of Fraser and Harvey Nichols; with John Lewis opened its biggest store outside London in the city's New Street station development in 2015. The city's designer and high-end fashion stores are mostly situated in the upmarket Mailbox shopping centre, around the Colmore Row financial district, although the Bullring has seen an influx of designer brands such as Hugo Boss, Thomas Sabo, Radley and Armani Exchange.

== Tourism ==
With major facilities such as the International Convention Centre, the National Exhibition Centre and the Symphony Hall the Birmingham area accounts for 42% of the UK conference and exhibition trade. The city's sporting and cultural venues attract large numbers of visitors, including the library of Birmingham, which is the largest public library in Europe. Birmingham is the 4th most visited city in the UK.

== Research ==
Birmingham is home to five universities: Aston University, University of Birmingham, Birmingham City University, University College Birmingham and Newman University. The city also hosts major campuses of the University of Law and BPP University, as well as the Open University's West Midlands regional base. In 2011 Birmingham had 78,259 full-time students from all over the world aged 18–74 resident in the city during term time, more than any other city in the United Kingdom outside London. Birmingham has 32,690 research students, also the highest number of any major city outside London.

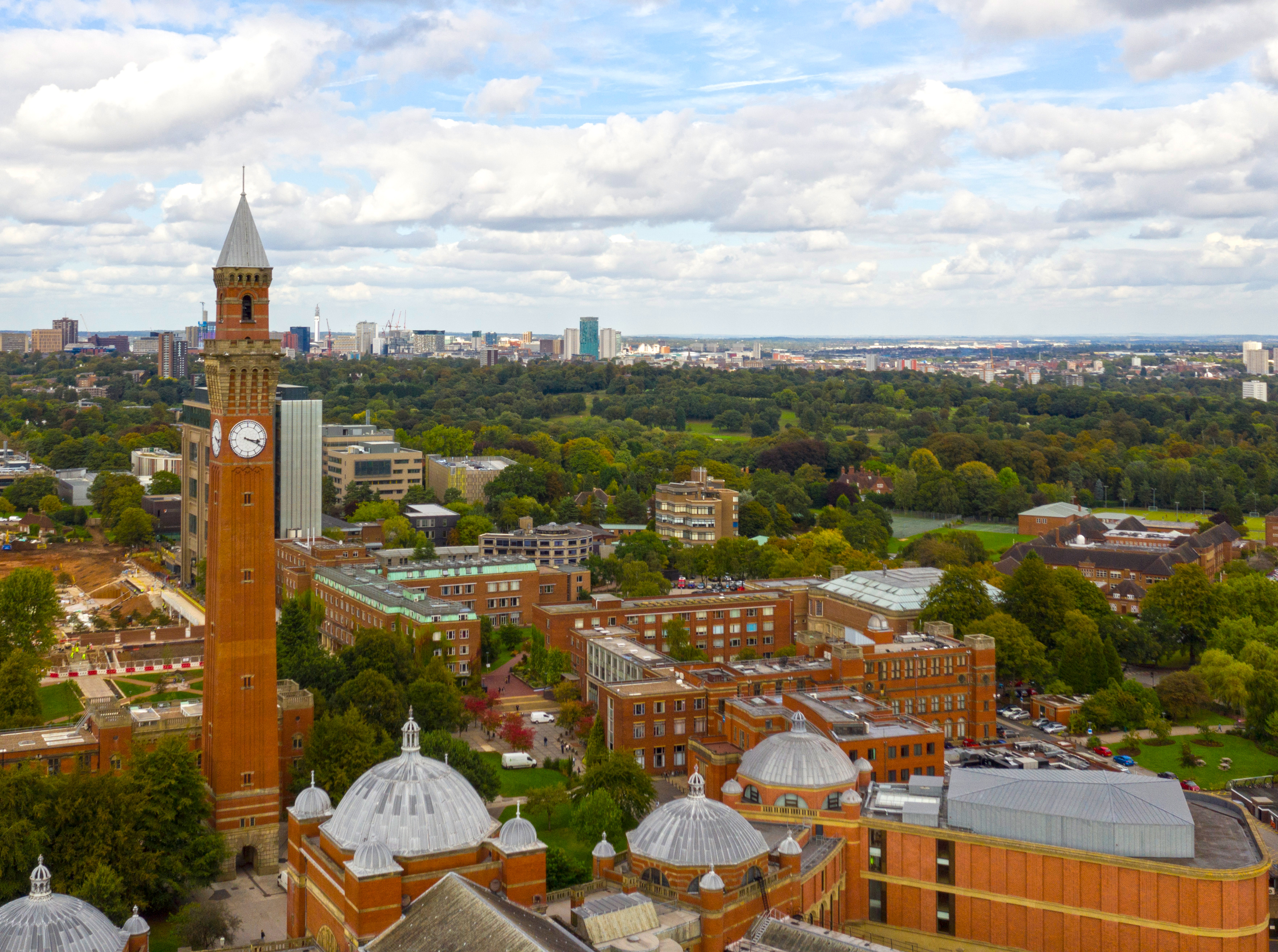
The University of Birmingham is one of the largest in Europe.

The Birmingham Business School, established by Sir William Ashley in 1902, is the oldest graduate-level business school in the United Kingdom. Another top business school in the city includes Aston Business School, one of fewer than 1% of business schools globally to be granted triple accreditation, and Birmingham City Business School. Royal Birmingham Conservatoire, part of Birmingham City University, offers professional training in music and acting.

Birmingham is an important centre for religious education. St Mary's College, Oscott is one of the three seminaries of the Catholic Church in England and Wales; Woodbrooke is the only Quaker study centre in Europe; and Queen's College, Edgbaston is an ecumenical theological college serving the Church of England, the Methodist Church and the United Reformed Church.

Birmingham Metropolitan College is one of the largest further education colleges in the country, with fourteen campuses spread across Birmingham and into the Black Country and Worcestershire. South & City College Birmingham has nine campuses spread throughout the city. Bournville College is based in a £66 million, 4.2 acre campus in Longbridge that opened in 2011. Fircroft College is a residential college based in a former Edwardian mansion in Selly Oak, founded in 1909 around a strong commitment to social justice, with many courses aimed at students with few prior formal qualifications. Queen Alexandra College is a specialist college based in Harborne offering further education to visually impaired or disabled students from all over the United Kingdom.

Research at the University of Birmingham, both theoretical and practical has contributed to the success of the city and the West Midlands region and had a worldwide impact for more than a century. Since the years 2010's the university ranks as high as 10th in the UK according to the QS World University Rankings. Scientific research including research into the controversial nano technology at the University of Birmingham, is expanding in the city and will possibly play a part in the city's economic future.

== Transport ==
Birmingham's local public transport network is co-ordinated by Transport for West Midlands (TfWM) which is a branch of the West Midlands Combined Authority. Birmingham has a high level of public transport usage; in 2015, 63% of morning peak trips into Birmingham were made by public transport, with the remaining 37% made by private car. Rail was the most popular public transport mode, accounting for 36.4% of journeys, followed by buses at 26.3% and the Metro at 0.3%.

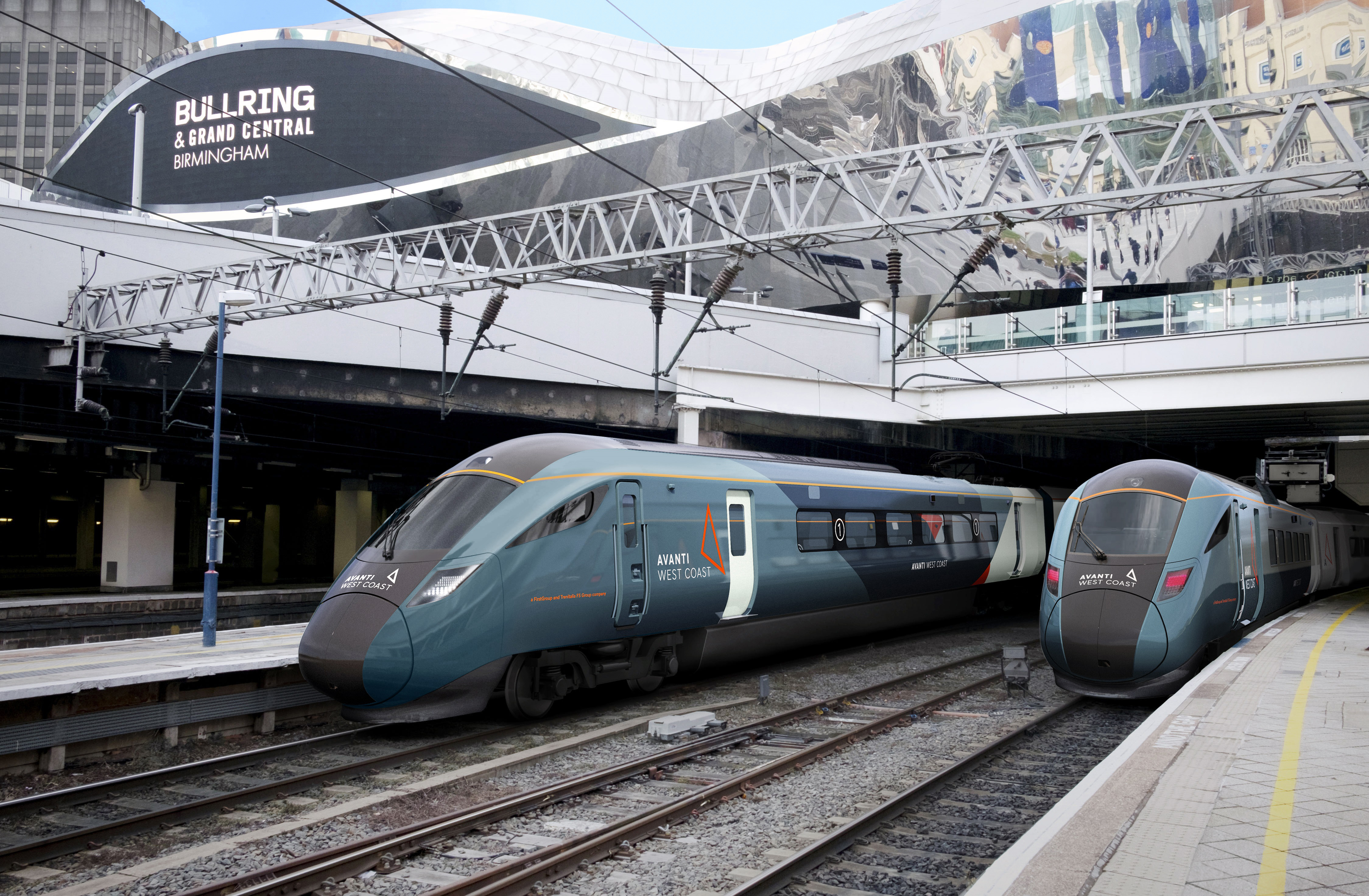
High-speed trains at Birmingham New Street

The main railway station in the city is Birmingham New Street, which is the busiest railway station in the UK outside London, both for passenger entries/exits and for passenger interchanges. It is the national hub for CrossCountry, the most extensive long-distance train network in Britain, and a major destination for Avanti West Coast services from London Euston, Glasgow Central and Edinburgh Waverley. Birmingham Moor Street and Birmingham Snow Hill form the northern termini for Chiltern Railways express trains running from London Marylebone. Curzon Street railway station, currently under construction, will be the terminus for trains to the city on High Speed 2, the first phase of which will open around 2030.

Birmingham and the surrounding region have a network of local and suburban railways, mostly operated by West Midlands Trains. There are a total of 70 railway stations within the West Midlands county, 34 of which are within Birmingham's city boundaries. Suburban railway lines in Birmingham include the Cross-City Line, the Chase Line, the Snow Hill Lines and the Birmingham loop. In 2016/17, there were nearly 55 million rail passenger journeys within the TfWM area, a big increase over the 23 million back in 2000/01.

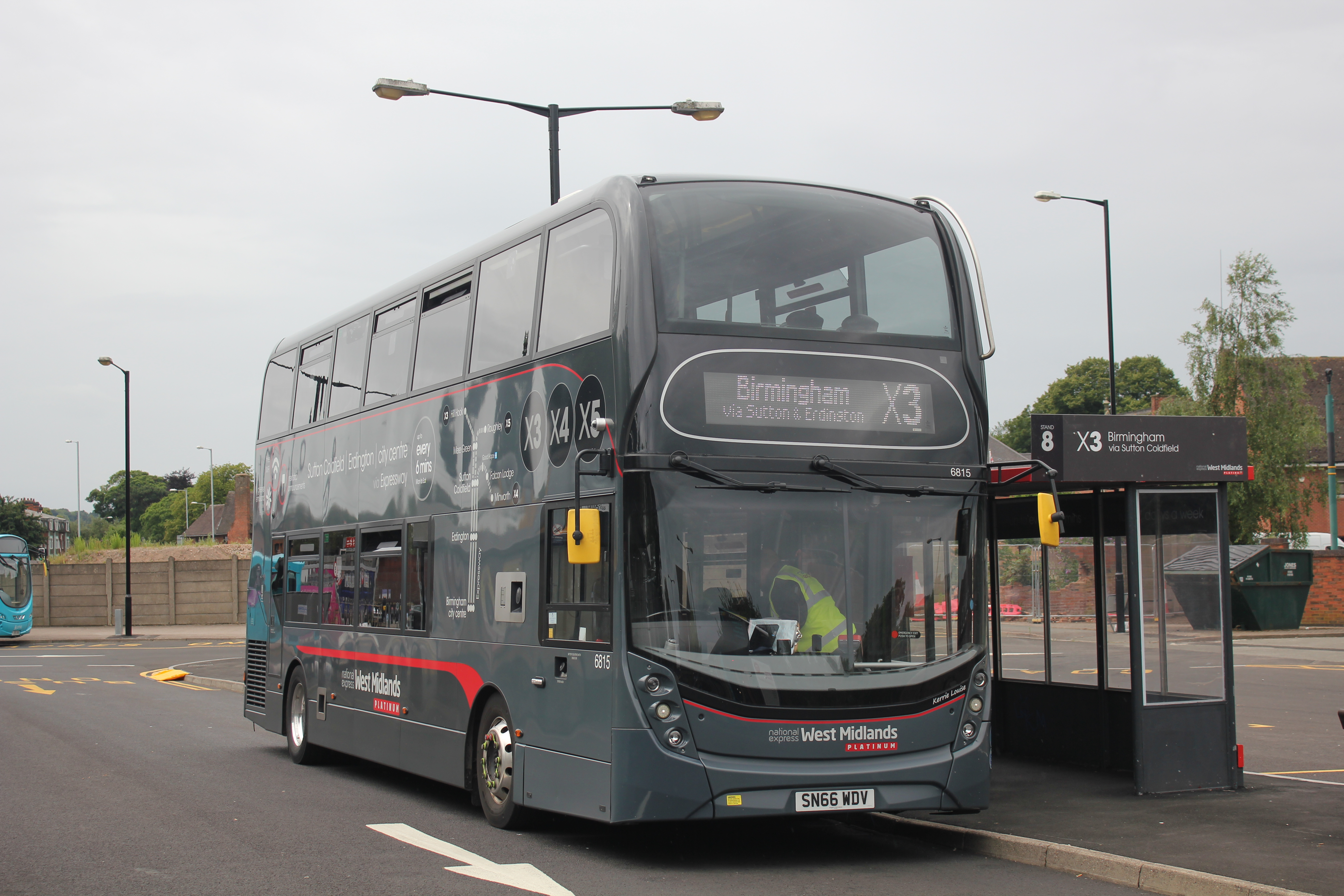
Bus networks are widespread throughout the city and region.

Historically, Birmingham had a substantial tram system operated by Birmingham Corporation Tramways which was closed in 1953. In 1999, trams returned to the city with the West Midlands Metro (formerly known as the Midland Metro) which operates services to the city of Wolverhampton. Since 2015–2016, after extension work, the tram network runs in the streets of central Birmingham, for the first time since 1953; further expansions of the West Midlands Metro system are underway with extensions and new lines being constructed. Bus networks are widespread throughout the city.

Sustrans' National Cycle Route 5 goes through central Birmingham, connecting with National Cycle Route 81 at Smethwick. National Cycle Route 535 from Sutton Coldfield terminates just north of Birmingham Snow Hill railway station. In 2021, Transport for West Midlands launched a cycle hire scheme involving over 300 bikes and 43 docking stations across the West Midlands, including central Birmingham.

An extensive canal system still remains in Birmingham from the Industrial Revolution. The city has more miles of canal than Venice, though the canals in Birmingham are a less prominent and essential feature due to the larger size of the city and the fact that few of its buildings are accessed by canal. The canals are mainly used today for leisure purposes; canalside regeneration schemes such as Brindleyplace have turned the canals into a tourist attraction.

== Banking, insurance and law ==
In 2011, Birmingham's financial and insurance services industry was worth £2.46 billion, the 4th largest in the United Kingdom after London, Edinburgh and Manchester. The city also had the fourth largest number of employees in the financial and insurance sector after London, Leeds and Glasgow, with more than 111,500 people employed in banking, finance and insurance, translating to 23% of all employees.

Birmingham has the two largest sets of barrister's chambers in the country; a local law society; 50 major property firms and one of Europe's largest insurance markets. Two of the UK's largest professional service organisations, PwC and Ernst & Young, have established centres in Birmingham's central business district.

The city attracts over 40% of the UK's total conference trade. Two of Britain's "big four" banks were founded in Birmingham: Lloyds Bank (now Lloyds Banking Group) was established in the city in 1765 and The Midland Bank (now HSBC Bank plc) opened in Union Street, in August 1836.

== Renewable resources ==
Birmingham has a large incineration plant, the Tyseley Energy from Waste Plant which produces electricity for the National Grid through the process of burning waste. It was built in 1996 by Veolia.

== Famous brands ==
Famous brands from the "city of a thousand trades" include Bird's Custard, Typhoo Tea, the Birmingham Wire Gauge, Brylcreem, Chad Valley Toys, BSA, Bakelite, Cadburys chocolate, HP Sauce, The Elite Performance Sports Company (Epic) and the MG Rover Group; although no Rover cars are set to be produced in the future, with Nanjing Automobile Group to focus on the MG cars.

== See also ==
- Economic history of Birmingham
- Economy of England
