= Core cities (disambiguation) =

A core city is the largest or most important city or cities of a metropolitan area.

Core cities may also refer to:

- Core cities of Japan
- Core Cities Group
- Core Cities Health Improvement Collaborative
