= Geonet =

Geonet may refer to:

- Geosynthetic, products used to solve civil engineering problems
- GEOnet Names Server, a database of place names used outside of the United States
- GeoNet (email host), an early international on-line services network
- GeoNet (New Zealand), a geological hazards monitoring service in New Zealand run by GNS Science

== See also ==
- GeoNetwork opensource
- Geo Network
- Net (disambiguation)
- Geo (disambiguation)
