= Manchester Host =

The Manchester Host was an early example of a municipal networking project. Its aim was to foster social and economic development in Manchester, England by encouraging the use of on-line communications and information services by businesses, public sector and voluntary organisations.

The project was launched in 1990 by a partnership of Manchester City Council, The Centre for Employment Research at Manchester Polytechnic (later Manchester Metropolitan University), and Poptel. At its core was an email and database service, accessible locally via dial-up and via the international X.25-network globally. The email service used equipment provided by German company GeoNet. A free-text database was accessed by what we'd now call a 'search engine' provided by a company called Memex.

The project involved a number of parallel activities including the establishment of "Electronic Village Halls": drop-in centres where users could learn about the new online communications and information ("telematics") technology; and the creation of the Manchester Community Information Network. These included the Bangladesh EVH, Chorlton EVH and the Women's EVH.

The Manchester Host has been cited as an important example of the use of technology for economic development.
