= Wired Sussex =

- Industry: Technology support
- Founded: 1997; 29 years ago
- Defunct: 2023
- Headquarters: Brighton, England
- Area served: South East England
- Website: www.wiredsussex.com

Wired Sussex was an independent, not-for-profit membership organisation that supported the digital, media and information technology sector in Brighton and Sussex. Membership comprised companies and freelancers working in the digital and creative industries sector.

== History ==
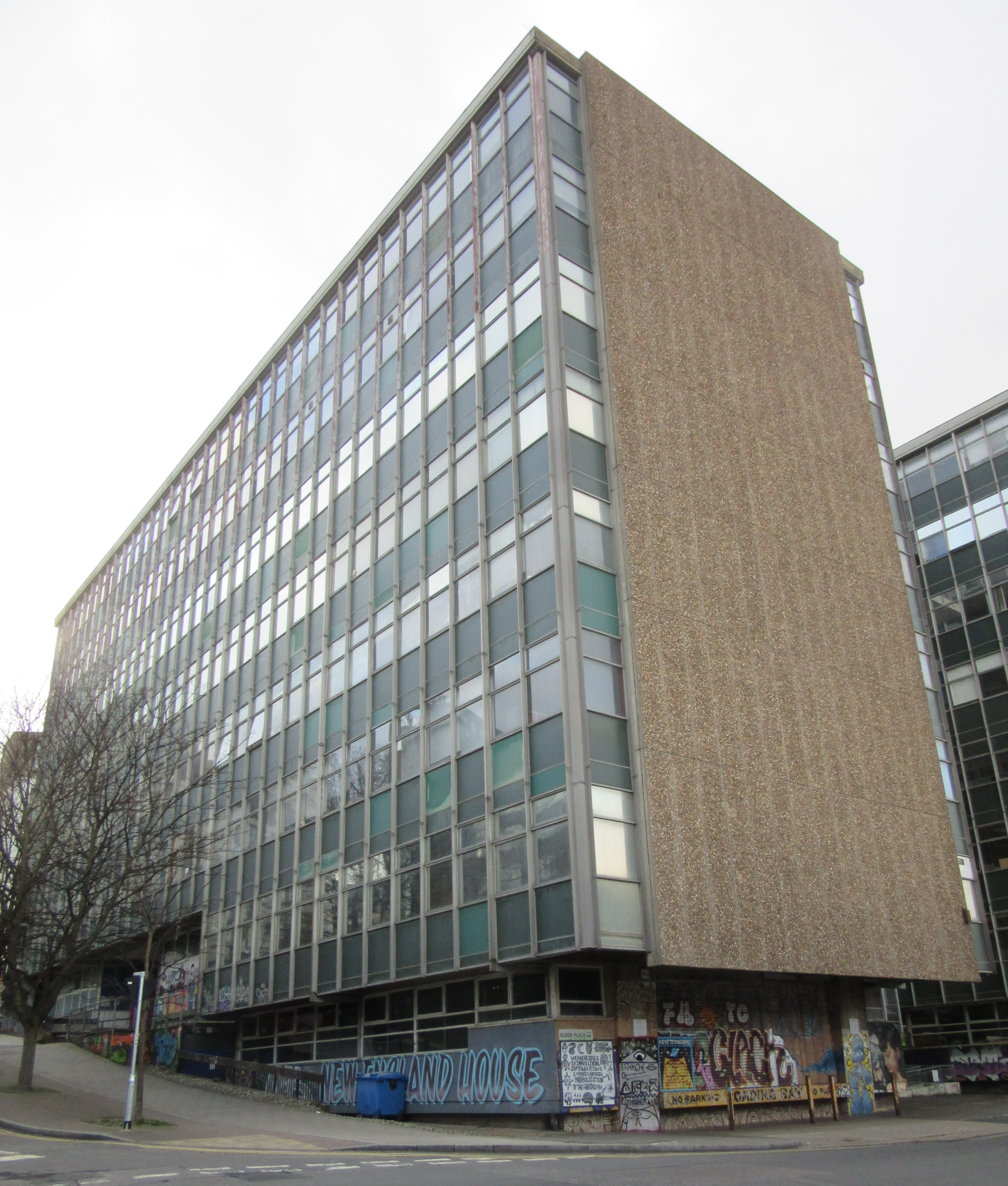
Wired Sussex was based in New England House, Brighton

Wired Sussex was established as an offshoot of the Sussex Enterprise Chamber of Commerce in 1997. Wired Sussex became a fully independent entity, receiving no further direct public funding, in August 2007. Wired Sussex, alongside Manchester Digital, Bristol Media and, originally, the South East Media Network formed an alliance, called One Digital, in 2009 to further represent and support the United Kingdom's key digital technology clusters outside London.

Wired Sussex was involved in a number of projects to support growth within the sector, including the creation of a Digital Catapult Centre in Brighton. The Centre is one of three Digital Catapult Centres set up by Innovate UK (the Technology Strategy Board) to promote research and development collaboration, in order to rapidly advance the UK's best digital ideas.

Previously, Wired Sussex delivered a two-year research and development project which mapped and measured Brighton's creative, digital and IT (CDIT) cluster, carried out in 2013. The Brighton Fuse project supported mutually beneficial connections between higher education, those engaged in the creation of arts and culture and Brighton's digital technology sector.

A further study was completed in 2014 that focused on freelancers working in the Brighton sector.

It went into voluntary liquidation in 2023.

== Structure ==
Wired Sussex was a company limited by guarantee (commonly known as a not-for-profit) and had no shareholders. It was governed by a board of directors, all of whom were owners and senior managers of prominent digital businesses in South East England. Its chair was Alex Morrison, CEO of Cogapp and its deputy Chair was Holger Bollmann, Director of WPM Education.

== General references ==
- Greg Clark MP & Nick Clegg (11 March 2014). “Brighton City Deal to help create "Silicon Beach"”. Gov.UK. Retrieved 29 May 2015.
