= Manchester Digital =

Manchester Digital is an association of people and organisations working with digital media and digital technology based in and around Manchester, UK. It acts as a trade association and collaboration network. Its stated aims are to foster cooperation and promote the work done by its members to other businesses and outside the city and its region.

Members include companies, freelancers, public and third sector organisations, individuals and students working in areas including 'new media', web development, digital marketing, SEO, software development, internet services provision, Internet hosting and games development. Members agree to abide by a code of practice.

Manchester Digital organises events including The Big Chip Awards for digital work in Northern England. It recently co-launched the IBZL programme with The Open University.

Manchester Digital is structured as a not-for profit association and is funded by member subscription. It works closely with other organisations such as the Manchester Digital Development Agency, part of Manchester City Council, and the One Digital Alliance.

== History ==
Manchester Digital was formed in 2001 by a small group of individuals and companies working in the internet industry, including broadcaster Tony Wilson and Internet service provider (ISP) Poptel. It had initial support from the inward investment agency for Manchester and Manchester City Council. It took responsibility for the Big Chip Awards in 2002.

One Digital, a national alliance of organisations with similar aims and objectives was launched in 2009 by Manchester Digital, Bristol Media and South East Media Network. One Digital now includes Wired Sussex.

== Structure ==
The association was initially governed by an informal voluntary board. In 2003 it adopted a new two-tier structure with a formal constitution.

Manchester Digital Association is now governed by an elected 12-person council and is the sole member of Manchester Digital Limited, a not-for-profit company that runs events and other activities.
