= Poptel =

Early British internet provider and workers co-operative

- Company type: Worker co-operative
- Founded: 1983
- Headquarters: Manchester, United Kingdom

Poptel was initially an email and bulletin board service, and later a British internet and on-line services provider that was run by an employee co-operative (worker co-operative) from 1986 to 2002.

In the 1980s, Poptel offered on-line communications and information services to international NGOs, working in particular with the Interdoc group. Poptel was a partner in the Manchester Host and the Kirklees Host and became known as a provider of Internet services to the Labour Party. Working with the National Cooperative Business Association of the US, it launched the successful bid to create a top level Internet domain for use exclusively by co-operatives - ".coop".

Poptel was "demutualised" and broken up into smaller businesses in September 2002. Staff from the web development department formed a new co-operative, Poptech (later Fused Technologies). OSG Co-op (now Midcounties Co-operative) took over the .coop registry operation. The retail Internet Services business was merged with The Phone Co-op in 2003. In 2012, the .coop registry was transferred to the International Co-operative Alliance.

== History ==
Poptel was a trading name for Soft Solution Ltd, a worker co-operative founded in 1983. Poptel's first on-line service, based on the GeoNet platform, was launched in March 1986. The Manchester Host was launched in 1990.
