= Airport City Manchester =

Property development scheme in Manchester, England

General information
- Status: Under construction
- Type: Logistics, manufacturing, office, hotel, leisure
- Location: Manchester Airport, Manchester, England
- Construction started: 2012
- Estimated completion: 12-15 year redevelopment project
- Cost: £800M
- Owner: Manchester Airports Group

Design and construction
- Architect: 5plus Architects
- Developer: MAG Developments, BCEG, Argent

Airport City Manchester is an £800 million expansion of Manchester Airport currently under construction. The plan will follow an airport city model with the aim of stimulating the Greater Manchester economy by creating on-site logistics, manufacturing, office and leisure facilities. Manchester Airport will become the first airport in the United Kingdom to build an airport city.

Manchester Airport is the third-busiest airport in the United Kingdom after Heathrow and Gatwick, and is the international gateway for northern England. The site was announced as an enterprise zone in March 2011. In October 2013, it was announced that Beijing Construction Engineering Group would invest £800 million into the project—becoming one of the largest single investments in Britain from China. It will be one of the largest property development schemes in Greater Manchester alongside MediaCityUK and NOMA, as well as in the United Kingdom.

China's paramount leader Xi Jinping, alongside former UK Prime Minister David Cameron, visited the Airport City development in October 2015 as part of his state visit to the United Kingdom.

== Proposal ==
Airport City Manchester will follow the airport city model, that has been implemented at other cities such as Barcelona and Frankfurt. Two main zones will house the new developments. The first will be adjacent to Manchester Airport station, and north of the M56 motorway. The site here will mainly consist of hotel, office, and manufacturing facilities. The second core site will be situated nearby the existing cargo centre near junction 6 of the M56.

== Scheme ==
Manchester Airport is the third-busiest airport in the United Kingdom, and is overall the busiest outside the London region and has over double the number of passengers of its nearest non-London rival. It is predicted that Manchester Airport will double its 18 million passengers in 2011 to 36 million by 2030. Unlike London Heathrow and Gatwick Airport, vacant land exists around Manchester Airport for expansion. Both Heathrow and Gatwick have encountered opposition in their wish to expand, particularly over a third runway at Heathrow. In March 2011, the site was selected as an enterprise zone, offering lower business rates to attract investment in the area. Former UK Chancellor George Osborne described the zone as one of the best developed and most advanced of any of the 24 enterprise zones which were announced in 2011. The site plan and design will be led by Manchester-based 5plus Architects. Construction will be undertaken by a joint venture of Carillion and Beijing Construction Engineering Group. It was scheduled to open in 2016. The development was renamed MIX Manchester in May 2024, with a stated refocus on laboratories and research facilities in addition to office space.

== Transport ==
Enterprise Way, a new road within the site, started construction in January 2017 and was completed in February 2018.

== See also ==
- Atlantic Gateway - a similar proposal in North West England that focuses on increasing maritime logistics to the region
