= Manchester Airports Group =

UK holding company

Manchester Airports Holdings Limited
- Trade name: Manchester Airports Group (MAG)
- Type: Public holding
- Industry: Transport
- Founded: 2001
- Headquarters: Manchester Airport, Manchester, Greater Manchester, England, United Kingdom
- Key people: Charlie Cornish (Chair); Ken O'Toole FCA (CEO); Jan Bramall FCA (CFO)
- Products: Airport operations and services
- Revenue: £893.4 million (2020) ▲3.7%
- Operating income: £382.1 million (2020)▲6.8%
- Total assets: £4.2144 billion (2020) ▲0.01%
- Total equity: £1.3457 billion (2020) ▼9.8%
- Owner: Manchester City Council (35.5%); IFM Global Infrastructure Fund (35.5%); Other Greater Manchester Local Authorities (29%)
- Number of employees: 40,000
- Subsidiaries: MAG Developments; CAVU Manchester Airport; Stansted Airport; East Midlands Airport
- Website: www.magairports.com

Manchester Airports Group Limited (known as MAG) is a British airport operator which owns and operates three British airports: Manchester Airport, East Midlands Airport and Stansted Airport.

The Group operates under Manchester Airports Holdings Limited, a holding company owned by the ten metropolitan borough councils of Greater Manchester and Australian investment fund IFM Investors. Founded in 2001, MAG is the largest UK-owned airport operator, following the purchase of BAA by Ferrovial in 2006. As of July 2025, the company handled 64 million passengers across 2024-25.

Of the ten metropolitan boroughs of Greater Manchester, Manchester City Council holds the largest stake, at 35.5 per cent. The remaining nine councils hold a total of 29 per cent. IFM Investors own a 35.5 per cent stake in MAG. The Group has its registered office at Manchester Town Hall. MAG operates on a commercial basis at arm's length from its public owners who only take a dividend from profits. This was £20 million in 2010 while MAG retained £80 million from the £100 million profit.

== History ==
Manchester Airport opened in 1938 funded by Manchester Corporation, and has remained in public ownership ever since. It is the third-busiest airport in the United Kingdom after Heathrow and Gatwick, and is fractionally busier than Stansted (see Busiest airports in the United Kingdom by total passenger traffic). The M56 motorway was built to serve the airport in 1972, a rail station opened in 1993 along with Terminal 2 and a second runway was completed in 2001.

In 1999, Manchester Airport bought Humberside Airport marking its arrival as an airport management company. In 2000, National Express put both East Midlands and Bournemouth Airport up for sale - both of which were sold for £241 million to MAG in 2001. Consequently, the councils of Greater Manchester saw it fit to create a dedicated holding company to manage this portfolio at arm's length. Manchester Airports Group was formed in 2001 to own and operate Manchester Airport and the other smaller acquisitions.

MAG runs airport service-related businesses including baggage handling and ground services, car parking, fire-fighting, airport security, engineering, motor transport services and advertising. The property and development arm of MAG, previously known as MADL (Manchester Airport Developments), was rebranded as MAG Developments in early 2009.

The Group reported 2007/08 profits of £96.5m and decided in 2008 to sell Humberside Airport after 9 years of ownership. However this decision was reversed later in the year following a surge in passenger numbers and little interest from potential bidders. However, MAG sold its 83.7% share of Humberside in 2012 for £2.3 million to Eastern Group who operate nearly half of all flights there amid a return to a general decline of passenger numbers for small regional airport and desire to focus on larger airports.

MAG in partnership with a Canadian pension fund and financial assets unsuccessfully bid for London Gatwick Airport, this followed a report by the Competition Commission into BAA's market dominance in London/South East England and Scotland forcing it to sell off some of its airports. MAG made a £1.4 billion offer to acquire Gatwick Airport in 2009. Originally BAA wanted £2 billion for the airport, but eventually came down to an asking price of £1.5 billion. However, MAG refused to arrange a further £100 million of finance and consequently pulled out of the race.

In 2011 the proposed Airport City Manchester office and commercial space development abutting the airport became one of the Governments new low tax Enterprise Zones, the zones featured include World Logistics Hub to the south of the airport offering logistics and air freight, Airport City to the north of the airport offering office and high-tech manufacturing, MediPark around Wythenshawe Hospital for medical and clinical firms alongside several retail, office and business parks inside the town of Wythenshawe itself. The Group are focused on delivering the £659 million Manchester Airport City. Planning permission for the Airport City development was confirmed on 17 January 2013 and construction work is due to begin in February 2013. On 18 January 2013, it was announced that MAG would purchase Stansted Airport from Heathrow Airport Holdings for £1.5 billion. IFM Investors purchased a 35.5% stake in MAG to help fund the takeover. The sale was completed on 28 February 2013.

In June 2023, the company announced the appointment of Ken O'Toole as its chief executive from 1 October 2023.

== Corporate structure and ownership ==
The term Manchester Airports Group (MAG) refers to the consolidated group of entities controlled by Manchester Airports Holdings Limited (MAHL).

MAG consists of two main entities: Manchester Airports Holdings Limited (MAHL) and Manchester Airport Group Investments Limited (MAGIL). MAHL serves as the parent company and holding entity, while MAGIL functions as the main operating company, directly owning and managing the group's airports and related businesses.

MAG is majority owned by the ten local authorities of Greater Manchester, with Manchester City Council owning 35.5 per cent. The remaining nine authorities, the Metropolitan Boroughs of Bolton, Bury, Oldham, Rochdale, Stockport, Tameside, Trafford, Wigan, together with Salford City Council, collectively own 29 per cent. In 2012, it was decided that rules on shareholding would be changed to allow external, private investors to purchase stakes in order to provide extra capital for future investment and takeovers of airports. Manchester City Council would retain a controlling stake over the organisation. To raise funds for the purchase of Stansted Airport, IFM Investors purchased a 35.5 per cent share in the group.

=== Subsidiaries ===
MAG operates around 48 subsidiary undertakings that support its airport operations and related services. Key subsidiaries include East Midlands International Airport Limited, Manchester Airport Plc, and Stansted Airport Limited.

The group also encompasses several investment holding companies, such as Manchester Airport Finance Holdings Limited and MAG US (Apollo) Inc, which facilitate financial operations and investment activities. Additionally, MAG has trading companies, including MAG Airport Limited and Manchester Airport Car Park (1) Limited, that provide various services related to airport travel and parking.

CAVU is the digital travel services subsidiary of MAG launched in July 2022, formed by the rebranding of Manchester Airports Group's (MAG) divisions, MAGO and MAG USA. CAVU offers an eCommerce platform for pre-booking airport services, revenue management, and a network for airport parking. Its Escape Lounges airport lounge brand operates in 15 international airports. The name "CAVU" comes from the aviation term meaning "Ceiling and Visibility Unlimited."

== Airports ==
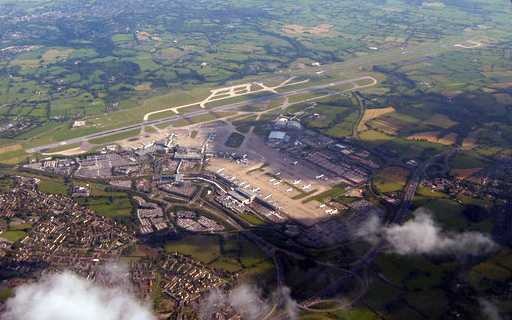
MAG owns and operates Manchester Airport, the third busiest airport in the United Kingdom.

MAG owns three airports in the United Kingdom (see Busiest airports in the United Kingdom by total passenger traffic).

| National rank | Airport | Airport workers | Total passengers 2013 | Total passengers 2014 | Total passengers 2015 | Total passengers 2016 | Total passengers 2017 | Total passengers 2024 | Total passengers 2025 | Change 2024/25 |
|---|---|---|---|---|---|---|---|---|---|---|
| 3 | Manchester Airport | 23,400 | 20,751,581 | 21,989,682 | 23,136,047 | 25,637,054 | 27,826,054 | 30,789,056 | 32,072,136 | ▲4.2% |
| 4 | London Stansted Airport | 12,100 | 17,852,393 | 19,941,593 | 22,519,178 | 24,320,071 | 25,904,450 | 29,694,316 | 29,758,490 | ▲0.2% |
| 13 | East Midlands Airport | 5,850 | 4,334,117 | 4,510,544 | 4,450,862 | 4,653,818 | 4,878,781 | 4,133,398 | 3,955,756 | ▼4.3% |
| Total | | 41,350 | 43,598,363 | 47,103,403 | 50,812,863 | 55,278,924 | 58,609,285 | 64,616,770 | 65,786,382 | ▲1.0% |
