= GeoNet (email host) =

Early international on-line services network

The GeoNet logo

GeoNet was an early international online services network built using microcomputers. Based on the software developed in Germany by GeoNet Systems GmbH in the early 1980s, and completed in the early 1990s, it was one of the first networks to offer a comprehensive online services platform, and was early to market with a number of innovations. Unlike other "mailbox" systems at the time, GeoNet had a user-friendly command interface and made extensive use of distributed processing technology.

== History ==
GeoNet became an important force in the European market within 15 months of introducing its first system in the early 1980s, and by 1986 had an installed base of some 25 systems in 8 countries. By the early 1990s, GeoNet systems had been established in Austria, France, Germany, Guatemala, Ireland, Italy, Luxembourg, Netherlands, Poland, Portugal, Switzerland, UK, USA and USSR. Apart from the Austrian PTT and An Post in Ireland, most of the operators were independent private companies.

== System features and design ==
GeoNet systems were strongly interconnected using a proprietary pre-X.400 protocol, called "InterMail". The so-called "GeoMail" network constituted a worldwide “private domain”, later interconnected with other public and private domains through X.400.

Later versions of GeoNet software ran under OpenVMS on DEC hardware. The largest installations ran on Alpha clusters. GeoNet operated centralised system monitoring and maintenance from Germany.

Some of the many innovative features of the GeoNet systems:

- Cross-system accounting and clearing: the systems were able to bill for many on-line activities, but also had a built-in micropayment clearing system whereby users of one system could use services offered on another and be billed accordingly.
- Unified database front end: the GeoNet philosophy was to offer users a "one-stop-shop" for on-line services. Users could access a wide range of remote on-line databases using a sophisticated gateway called Intelligent Interface, developed with a research grant from the European Commission. The cost of accessing remote databases was added to the user's bill.
- Unified messaging: GeoNet was one of the first systems to offer "unified messaging" (a term introduced by Ovum Ltd. in the UK). The "one-stop-shop" metaphor was extended by allowing message exchange with fax, telex, teletex, SMS, pager, voice and Inmarsat-C. GeoNet was one of the first systems to introduce a fax-out service, and also one of the first systems to offer private fax-in numbers, allowing users to send and receive faxes from wherever they could get a connection to their mailbox.
- Multilingual user interface, in Dutch, English, French, German, Italian, Polish, Portuguese, Russian and Spanish.
- Forerunner of instant messaging: users could "chat" live online.

== Operators ==
The UK systems GEO2 and MCR1 were run by Poptel which aimed its services at non-commercial organisations, and the distinctive GeoNet addressing format (e.g. GEO2:TONY.BLAIR – a well-known user in the early 1990s) was widely recognised in NGO and labour movement circles.

In addition, Computer Access (originally Hackney Computer Access)* [see http://www.access-it.org.uk ] created the Hackney HOST using the GeoNet technology, using this to tackle digital exclusion within East London and the Lea Valley, under the aegis of City Challenge funding.

The system in the USSR, MOS1, was established at the height of the "glasnost" period and relayed information about the attempted coup in 1991 to the Western media.

The GeoNet name is now used by a German Security-ISP. Geonet's last hostmaster—Kay-Michael Sonntag from Höxter—took over the website | geonet.de as well as their customer base on 21 December 2012 together with Arno Witt and founded the entrepreneurial community of the Web-Security-Hosting-Services already in October 2012.

In October 2018, Arno Witt (who previously owned 50% of the company) took over the shares of Web Security Hosting Services UG and integrated the company into the WE Webdesign (owner: Arno Witt) in January 2019. Since then, GeoNet has continued as a department of WE Webdesign. The products of GeoNet, especially the mail accounts from geonet.de and geonet.com, which partly existed since the early 90s, will be strengthened in the future and offered through the WSHS-Solutions.
