= Core Cities Group =

Advocacy group of cities in the United Kingdom

- Locations of the twelve members
- Established: 1995
- Headquarters: Manchester Town Hall
- Region served: United Kingdom
- Director: Stephen Jones
- Chair: James Lewis
- Staff: 4
- Website: www.corecities.com

The Core Cities Group (also Core Cities UK) is a self-selected and self-financed collaborative advocacy group of large regional cities in the United Kingdom outside Greater London. The group was formed in 1995 and serves as a partnership of twelve city councils: Belfast, Birmingham, Bristol, Cardiff, Edinburgh, Glasgow, Leeds, Liverpool, Manchester, Newcastle, Nottingham and Sheffield.

The Core Cities Group has wide-ranging interests, encompassing transport and connectivity, innovation and business support, skills and employment, sustainable communities, culture and creative industries, climate change, finance and industry, and governance. During 2012, the first wave of city deals recognised the eight cities as "the largest and most economically important English cities outside of London". The group in 2020 featured a combined population of over 6 million within eleven of its cities. It has been considered one of the most powerful political lobbying groups in the country.

The Core Cities Group is represented on the Local Government Leaders' Council by its chair.

== History ==
The group formed in 1995 and membership was made up of eight local authorities with city status; of which six are metropolitan borough councils and two are unitary authorities in the English local government system. These cities were: Birmingham, Bristol, Leeds, Liverpool, Manchester, Newcastle, Nottingham and Sheffield. The local authorities came together to challenge the centralised nature of the British state by advocating for the devolution of greater freedom and controls. The eight city councils are also members of the pan-European Eurocities network, a group co-founded by Birmingham City Council.

With the exception of Bradford and Hull, the initial members of the group mirrored the first county boroughs, that is the 10 English cities "dealt with as separate counties" under the Local Government Act 1888. Since 2010, several British cities outside England began discussions for incorporation into the group. In August 2014, Glasgow joined the group as the first non-English city, followed by Cardiff in 2014, Belfast in 2019, and Edinburgh in 2025.

In 2018, Bristol hosted the first meeting of Core Cities Group leaders with combined authority mayors. In October 2018, the group published a report titled "Cities 2030: Global Success, Local Prosperity", arguing for the economic potential of British cities – where they lag behind international counterparts – combined with a vision for cities.

== Government lobbying and issues ==
=== Devolution and greater powers ===
The Core Cities Group (CCG) have published research on the utilised benefits of more powerful cities that have greater economic control, particularly in growth and productivity. During the passage of the Localism Act 2011, the group promoted the 'Core Cities amendment' to allow for bespoke decentralisation to its members, which was successfully incorporated. Several of the 'City Deals' subsequently agreed between the Cabinet Office/Department for Communities and Local Government in 2012 included enhanced powers and city regional working at their core, including new combined authorities, thanks to the provision. The introduction of directly-elected mayors to combined authorities in England and the devolution of housing, transport, planning and policing powers to them were provisions contained in the Cities and Local Government Devolution Act 2016.

In 2015, the CCG published a report calling for devolution to England that gives powers similar to those of Scottish Parliament and to give the city-regions greater fiscal devolution by 2025. In 2016, Core Cities and Key Cities, together representing 36 of the UK's largest cities, issued a joint statement calling for greater powers to deliver a more inclusive economy. In 2020, the 11 councils of the CCG and the 32 London Boroughs within the London Councils group agreed to lobby for greater fiscal devolution, including "the right to introduce a tourism tax, borrow against future revenue and reforms to business rates and council tax."

=== Other issues ===
An interest of the group is the High Speed 2 project to interlink the larger British cities faster. Believing it will bring an economic advantage to the core cities. In 2019, Judith Blake, chair of the Core Cities Group and leader of Leeds City Council wrote "HS2 is more than just a railway line, it will unlock future jobs, training and regeneration opportunities that will benefit many of our 20 million citizens. Core Cities UK believes HS2 is a game-changer for the Midlands and the north".

The Core Cities Group has attempted to establish a dialogue with the European Union and the British government in the negotiations to leave the European Union, following the 2016 EU referendum. The combined electorate of the ten core cities saw 56% vote for remain. It was noted by Cardiff council leader Huw Thomas that EU investment out-weight the British Government's city deals. Because of this, the group has lobbied the government to maintain EU regeneration schemes in negotiations The group has also met chief European negotiator Michel Barnier. In 2019, the leaders of the cities in the group sent a letter to Prime Minister May asking her to avoid a no-deal Brexit. The Core Cities Group cities were beneficiaries of the UK Shared Prosperity Fund (UKSPF), an investment program designed to maintain town and city investment after Brexit. The group criticised the government for the amount and asked that the fund be doubled to £4 billion to lead to its work reaching £28bn by 2026.

During the COVID-19 pandemic in the United Kingdom the Core Cities Group advocated City Recovery Deals and a Cities Recovery Fund to facilitate good finances for cities following the pandemic and its subsequent lockdown. In May 2020, the CCG reported that those events had cost their councils £1.6bn collectively and advocated financial support from HM Treasury.

== Membership ==
City	Country	Local authority	Leader (political affiliation)	City population (2025)	Urban area population	Metro area population
Belfast	Northern Ireland	Belfast City Council	Micky Murray	351,927	-	799,000
Birmingham	England	Birmingham City Council	Chamam Lal	1,176,960	2,440,986	3,683,000
Bristol	England	Bristol City Council	Tony Dyer	495,260	617,280	1,041,000
Cardiff	Wales	Cardiff Council	Huw Thomas	381,516	447,287	1,097,000
Edinburgh	Scotland	City of Edinburgh Council	Jane Meagher	531,370		
Glasgow	Scotland	Glasgow City Council	Susan Aitken	654,330	1,209,143	1,395,000
Leeds	England	Leeds City Council	James Lewis	840,550	1,901,934	2,302,000
Liverpool	England	Liverpool City Council	Joanne Anderson	507,915	864,122	2,241,000
Manchester	England	Manchester City Council	Garry Bridges	588,256	2,553,379	2,556,000
Newcastle	England	Newcastle City Council	Nick Kemp	320,838	774,891	1,599,000
Nottingham	England	Nottingham City Council	David Mellen	325,765	729,977	1,534,000
Sheffield	England	Sheffield City Council	Tom Hunt	579,517	685,368	1,569,000
