= List of international prime ministerial trips made by Lal Bahadur Shastri =

This is a list of international prime ministerial trips made by Lal Bahadur Shastri during his tenure as the Prime Minister of India from June 1964 and January 1966. The first overseas visit was to Egypt in October 1964.

== Summary of international trips ==
In his two-year long tenure as the Prime Minister, Lal Bahadur Shastri made 7 international trips, visiting 8 countries.

Prime Minister Lal Bahadur Shastri's visits by country
Number of visits	Country
1 visit (7)	Burma, Canada, Egypt, Nepal, Pakistan, United Kingdom, Yugoslavia
2 visits (1)	Soviet Union

== 1964 ==
	Country	Areas visited	Date(s)	Purpose	Notes
1	Egypt	Cairo	5–10 October	2nd NAM summit	
1	Pakistan	Karachi	October		On his way back from Cairo, the Prime Minister made a brief halt at Karachi and had discussions with the President of Pakistan

== 1965 ==
	Country	Areas visited	Date(s)	Purpose	Notes
2	Nepal	Kathmandu, Janakpur	23–25 April		
3	Soviet Union	Moscow	11–19 May		
4	Canada	Ottawa, Montreal	June		
4	United Kingdom	London	17–25 June	Commonwealth Prime Ministers' Conference	
5	Yugoslavia	Belgrade	July		
6	Burma	Yangon	20–23 December		

== 1966 ==
	Country	Areas visited	Date(s)	Purpose	Notes
7	Soviet Union	Tashkent	4–10 January	Tashkent Declaration	Shastri died of a heart attack in Tashkent on 11 January 1966.

== See also ==
- Premiership of Lal Bahadur Shastri
- List of international trips made by prime ministers of India
- History of Indian foreign relations
