= Institute of Science =

An Institute of Science is an educational institution that imparts higher education in various scientific disciplines.

Institute of Science may also refer to:

Austria

- Institute of Science and Technology, Austria

Bangladesh

- Institute of Science and Technology, Bangladesh

Canada

- Nova Scotian Institute of Science, Nova Scotia

China

- Guangdong Institute of Science and Technology, Tianhe District of Guangzhou City, Guangdong Province, China.
- Hunan Institute of Science and Technology, Hunan, China

India

- The Institute of Science, Mumbai, formerly known as Royal Institute of Science, Bombay
- Bansal Institute of Science and Technology, Bhopal, India
- Federal Institute of Science and Technology, Angamaly, Kerala
- Global Institute of Science & Technology, Haldia, West Bengal, India
- Indian Institute of Science Education and Research, Mohali, Punjab, India
- Indian Institute of Science Education and Research, Thiruvananthapuram, Kerala
- Indian Institute of Science, Bangalore
- Indian Institute of Space Science and Technology, Valiamala, Thiruvananthapuram, Kerala
- Indian Institutes of Science Education and Research, India
- Institute of Science and Technology, West Bengal
- Institute of Science and Technology, West Bengal, Paschim Medinipur district
- Institute of Science, Banaras Hindu University, Varanasi
- Konark Institute of Science and Technology, Bhubaneswar
- Lal Bahadur Shastri Integrated Institute of Science and Technology Malappuram, Kerala
- National Institute of Science and Technology, Berhampur
- National Institute of Science Education and Research, Bhubaneswar
- National Institute of Science, Technology and Development Studies, New Delhi, India
- Oriental Institute of Science and Technology, Bhopal
- Postgraduate Institute of Science, University of Peradeniya

Israel

- Weizmann Institute of Science, Rehovot, Israel

Japan

- Institute of Science Tokyo, Tokyo

Pakistan

- Shaheed Zulfikar Ali Bhutto Institute of Science and Technology, Pakistan

Philippines

- Eulogio "Amang" Rodriguez Institute of Science and Technology, Philippines

Rwanda

- Kigali Institute of Science and Technology, Kigali, Rwanda

Singapore

- German Institute of Science and Technology (Singapore), Singapore

South Korea

- Dongwon Institute of Science and Technology, Yangsan City, South Gyeongsang province, South Korea
- Gwangju Institute of Science and Technology, Gwangju, South Korea

Taiwan

- National Chung-Shan Institute of Science and Technology, Longtan District, Taoyuan, Taiwan

Tanzania

- Nelson Mandela African Institute of Science and Technology, Arusha, Tanzania

Thailand

- Thailand Graduate Institute of Science and Technology, Thailand

United Kingdom

- Institute of Science and Technology, UK
- University of Manchester Institute of Science and Technology, England

United States

- National Institute of Science, Louisiana
- National Science Institute, defunct, Michigan
