= List of international prime ministerial trips made by Atal Bihari Vajpayee =

This is a list of international prime ministerial trips made by Atal Bihari Vajpayee during his tenure as the Prime Minister of India from March 1998 and May 2004. The first overseas visit was to Sri Lanka to attend the 10th SAARC Summit in July 1998.

== Summary of international trips ==
In his six-year long tenure as the Prime Minister, Atal Bihari Vajpayee made 29 international trips, visiting 32 countries, including visits to the United States to attend the United Nations General Assembly.

Prime Minister Atal Bihari Vajpayee's visits by country
Number of visits	Country
1 visit (20)	Bangladesh, China, Iran, Italy, Jamaica, Japan, Laos, Morocco, Namibia, Nepal, Nigeria, Oman, Portugal, Syria, Tajikistan, Thailand, Trinidad and Tobago, United Kingdom, Vatican City, Vietnam
2 visits (10)	Cambodia, France, Germany, Indonesia, Malaysia, Mauritius, Pakistan, South Africa, Sri Lanka, Turkey
3 visits (1)	Russia
5 visits (1)	United States

== 1998 ==
	Country	Areas visited	Date(s)	Purpose	Notes
1	Sri Lanka	Colombo	28–31 July	10th SAARC summit	
2	Oman	Salalah	29–30 August	State visit	
2	Namibia	Windhoek	30–31 August	State visit	
2	South Africa	Durban	1–2 September	12th NAM summit	
2	Mauritius	Port Louis	3–4 September	State visit	
3	United NationsUnited States	New York City	22–28 September	United Nations General Assembly	
3	France	Paris	29–30 September	State visit	

== 1999 ==
	Country	Areas visited	Date(s)	Purpose	Notes
4	Trinidad and Tobago	Port of Spain	8–9 February	State visit	
4	Jamaica	Montego Bay	9–12 February	9th G15 summit	
4	Morocco	Rabat	13–14 February 1999	State visit	
5	Pakistan	Lahore	20–21 February	State visit	Inauguration of the Delhi–Lahore bus service.
6	Bangladesh	Dhaka	19–20 June	State visit	Inauguration of the Kolkata–Dhaka bus service.
7	South Africa	Durban	12–15 November	1999 Commonwealth Heads of Government Meeting	

== 2000 ==
	Country	Areas visited	Date(s)	Purpose	Notes
8	Mauritius	Port Louis	10–13 March	State visit	
9	Turkey	Ankara	March–April		
10	Italy	Rome	25–27 June	State visit	
10	Vatican City	Vatican City	26 June	State visit	
10	Portugal	Lisbon	28–29 June	State visit	
11	United NationsUnited States	New York City, Washington, D.C.	5–17 September	Millennium Summit; State visit	Vajpayee was the only foreign leader to have addressed the joint session of the 106th United States Congress.
11	Germany	Berlin	18–19 September	State visit	

== 2001 ==
	Country	Areas visited	Date(s)	Purpose	Notes
12	Vietnam	Hanoi	7–10 January	State visit	
12	Indonesia	Jakarta	10–14 January	State visit	
13	Iran	Tehran	10–13 April	State visit	
14	Malaysia	Kuala Lumpur	13–16 May	State visit	
15	Russia	Moscow	4–7 November	State visit	
15	United NationsUnited States	New York City, Washington, D.C.	7–11 November	State visit and United Nations General Assembly	Official working visit from 7-9 Nov. UNGA from 10 Nov.
15	United Kingdom	London	12–13 November	State visit	
16	Japan	Tokyo	7–11 December	State visit	

== 2002 ==
	Country	Areas visited	Date(s)	Purpose	Notes
17	Nepal	Kathmandu	3–6 January	11th SAARC summit	
18	Cambodia	Phnom Penh	9–11 April	State visit	
19	United NationsUnited States	New York City	12 September	United Nations General Assembly	Met with President George W. Bush at the UN General Assembly in New York City.
20	Cambodia	Phnom Penh	4–6 November	1st India–ASEAN summit	
20	Laos	Vientiane	6–8 November	State visit	

== 2003 ==
	Country	Areas visited	Date(s)	Purpose	Notes
21	Malaysia	Kuala Lumpur	22–25 February	13th NAM summit	
22	Germany	Berlin	27–28 May	State visit	
22	Russia	Saint Petersburg	29 May–1 June	Tercentenary celebrations of the city	
22	France	Évian-les-Bains	1–3 June	29th G8 summit	
23	China	Beijing, Luoyang	22–27 June	State visit	
24	Turkey	Ankara, Istanbul	16–19 September	State visit	
24	United NationsUnited States	New York City	20–28 September	United Nations General Assembly	Met with President George W. Bush at the United Nations General Assembly in New York City on 24 September.
25	Indonesia	Denpasar	5–8 October	2nd India-ASEAN summit	
25	Thailand	Bangkok	8–12 October	State visit	
26	Sri Lanka	Colombo	19–22 October	State visit	
27	Russia	Moscow	11–13 November	State visit	
27	Tajikistan	Dushanbe	13–14 November	State visit	
27	Syria	Damascus	14–16 November	State visit	
28	Nigeria	Abuja	4–7 December	2003 Commonwealth Heads of Government Meeting	

== 2004 ==
	Country	Areas visited	Date(s)	Purpose	Notes
29	Pakistan	Islamabad	3–6 January 2004	12th SAARC summit	

== See also ==
- Premiership of Atal Bihari Vajpayee
- List of international trips made by prime ministers of India
- History of Indian foreign relations
