= List of international prime ministerial trips made by Rajiv Gandhi =

This is a list of international prime ministerial trips made by Rajiv Gandhi during his tenure as the Prime Minister of India from October 1984 and December 1989. The first overseas visit was to the Soviet Union in March 1985.

== Summary of international trips ==
In his five-year long tenure as the Prime Minister, Rajiv Gandhi made 27 international trips, visiting 41 countries, including visits to the United States to attend the United Nations General Assembly.

Prime Minister Rajiv Gandhi's visits by country
Number of visits	Country
1 visit (28)	Algeria, Angola, Australia, Bahamas, Burma, Canada, China, Cuba, Czechoslovakia, Egypt, Hungary, Indonesia, Jordan, Maldives, Mauritius, Mexico, New Zealand, Oman, Spain, Sri Lanka, Sweden, Switzerland, Syria, Tanzania, Thailand, Turkey, West Germany, Zambia
2 visits (9)	Bangladesh, Bhutan, France, Nepal, Netherlands, United Kingdom, Vietnam, Yugoslavia, Zimbabwe
3 visits (2)	Japan, Pakistan
4 visits (2)	Soviet Union, United States

== 1985 ==
	Country	Areas visited	Date(s)	Purpose	Notes
1	Soviet Union		March		
2	Bangladesh	Dhaka	2 June		
2	Egypt		June		
2	Algeria		June		
2	United States	Washington, D.C.	11–15 June		
2	Switzerland	Geneva	17 June	71st International Labour Conference	
2	France		June		
3	Bhutan	Thimphu	September		
4	Bahamas	Nassau	16–20 October	1985 Commonwealth Heads of Government Meeting	
4	Cuba		21–22 October		
4	United NationsUnited States	New York City	22–24 October		Met with President Reagan on 23 October in New York City, at reception and luncheon at the U.N.
4	Soviet Union	Moscow	October		
4	Netherlands		October		
4	United Kingdom	London	October		
5	Oman	Muscat	17–18 November	15th Anniversary of Accession to the Throne by Sultan Qaboos	
6	Vietnam	Hanoi	27 November		
6	Japan	Tokyo	28 November–1 December		
7	Bangladesh	Dhaka	7–8 December	1st SAARC summit	

== 1986 ==
	Country	Areas visited	Date(s)	Purpose	Notes
8	Maldives	Malé	7–9 February		
9	Zambia		May		
9	Zimbabwe		May		
9	Angola		May		
9	Tanzania		May		
10	Mauritius		July		
11	Mexico		7–9 August		
11	Czechoslovakia	Prague	10 August		On his way back from Mexico.
11	United Kingdom	London	August	1986 Commonwealth Heads of Government Meeting	
12	Zimbabwe	Harare	September	8th NAM summit	
13	Indonesia		October		
13	Thailand		October		
13	Australia		October		
13	New Zealand		October		

== 1987 ==
	Country	Areas visited	Date(s)	Purpose	Notes
14	Soviet Union		2–4 July		
15	Sri Lanka	Colombo	29–30 July		
16	Japan	Tokyo	October	Transit visit	Gandhi visited Japan, Canada and USA from 11 to 21 October 1987.
16	Canada	Vancouver	October	1987 Commonwealth Heads of Government Meeting	
16	United NationsUnited States	Washington, D.C.	19–20 October	United Nations General Assembly	
16	Netherlands		October	Transit visit	
17	Nepal	Kathmandu	2–4 November	3rd SAARC summit	
18	Burma	Rangoon	15–16 December		

== 1988 ==
	Country	Areas visited	Date(s)	Purpose	Notes
19	Pakistan	Peshawar	January	Funeral of Abdul Ghaffar Khan	
19	Sweden		January	Six Nation Initiative	
20	Japan	Tokyo	April		
20	Vietnam		16 April		
21	Hungary		10–12 June		
21	West Germany		June		
21	United NationsUnited States		June	United Nations General Assembly	
21	Syria		June		
22	Yugoslavia		July		Yugoslavia, Jordan, Spain and Turkey 11 to 20 July 1988.
22	Jordan		July		
22	Spain		July		
22	Turkey		July		
23	Bhutan		23–27 September		
24	China		19–23 December		
25	Nepal		December		
25	Pakistan	Islamabad	29–31 December	4th SAARC summit	

== 1989 ==
	Country	Areas visited	Date(s)	Purpose	Notes
26	Pakistan		16–17 July		
26	France	Paris	July	Bicentenary celebrations of the French Revolution	
26	Soviet Union	Moscow	July		
27	Yugoslavia	Belgrade	3–8 September	9th NAM summit	

== See also ==
- List of international trips made by prime ministers of India
- History of Indian foreign relations
