= Foreign policy of the Indira Gandhi government =

The foreign policy of the Indira Gandhi government was the foreign policy of India between 1967 and 1977 during the Indira Gandhi premiership. It included a focus on security, by fighting militants abroad and strengthening border defenses. On 30 October 1981 at the meeting organised to mark silver jubilee celebration of the School of International Studies, Gandhi said, "A country’s policy is shaped by many forces- its position on the map, and the countries which are its neighbours, the policies they adopt, and the actions they take, as well as its historical experiences in the aggregate and in terms of its particular success or traumas."

== Non-aligned Movement ==
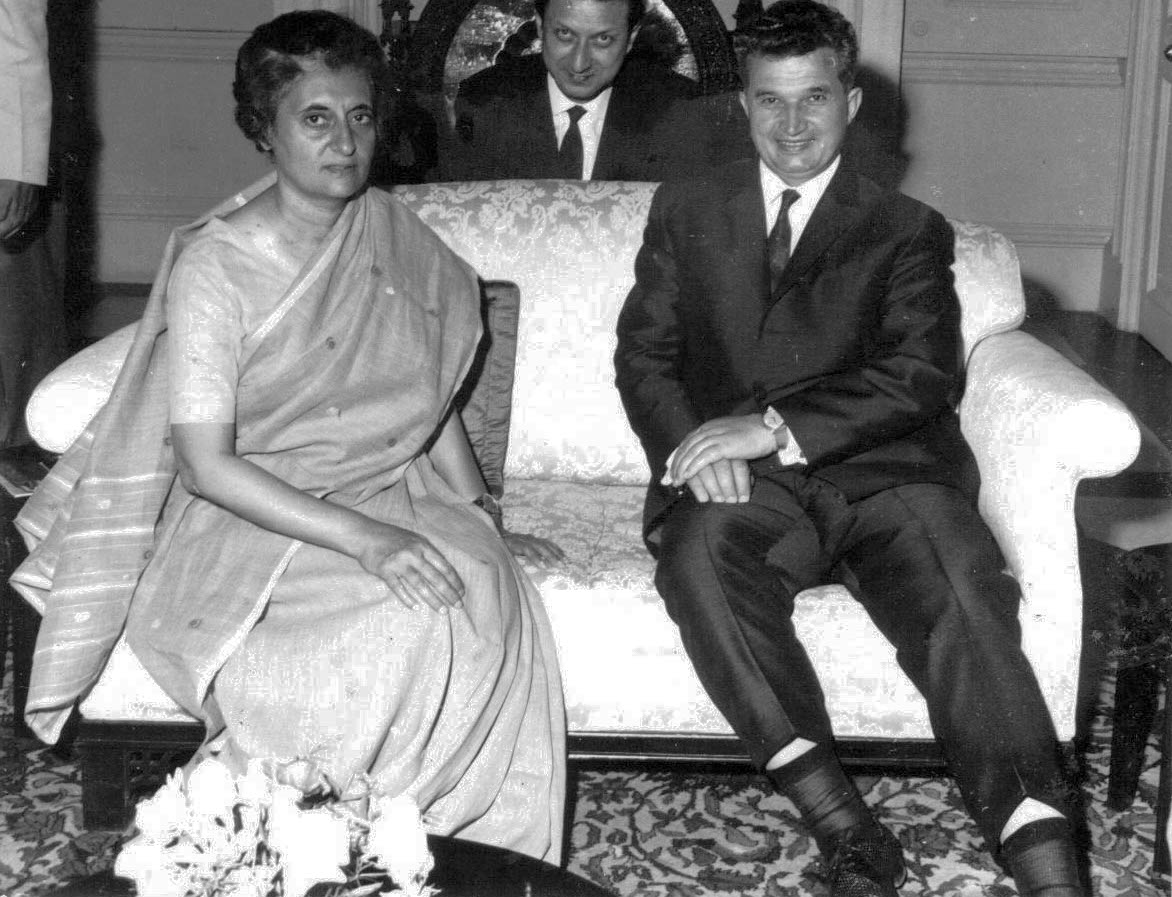
Gandhi with Nicolae Ceaușescu in 1969

In the early 1980s under Gandhi, India attempted to reassert its prominent role in the Non-Aligned Movement by focusing on the relationship between disarmament and economic development. By appealing to the economic grievances of developing countries, Gandhi and her successors exercised a moderating influence on the Non-aligned movement, diverting it from some of the Cold War issues that marred the controversial 1979 Havana meeting where Cuban leader Fidel Castro attempted to steer the movement towards the Soviet Union. Although hosting the 1983 summit at Delhi boosted Indian prestige within the movement, its close relations with the Soviet Union and its pro-Soviet positions on Afghanistan and Cambodia limited its influence. Gandhi boosted the NAM summit in New Delhi in 1967 to strengthen the unity and co-operation among Afro-Asian countries.

== Indo-US ==
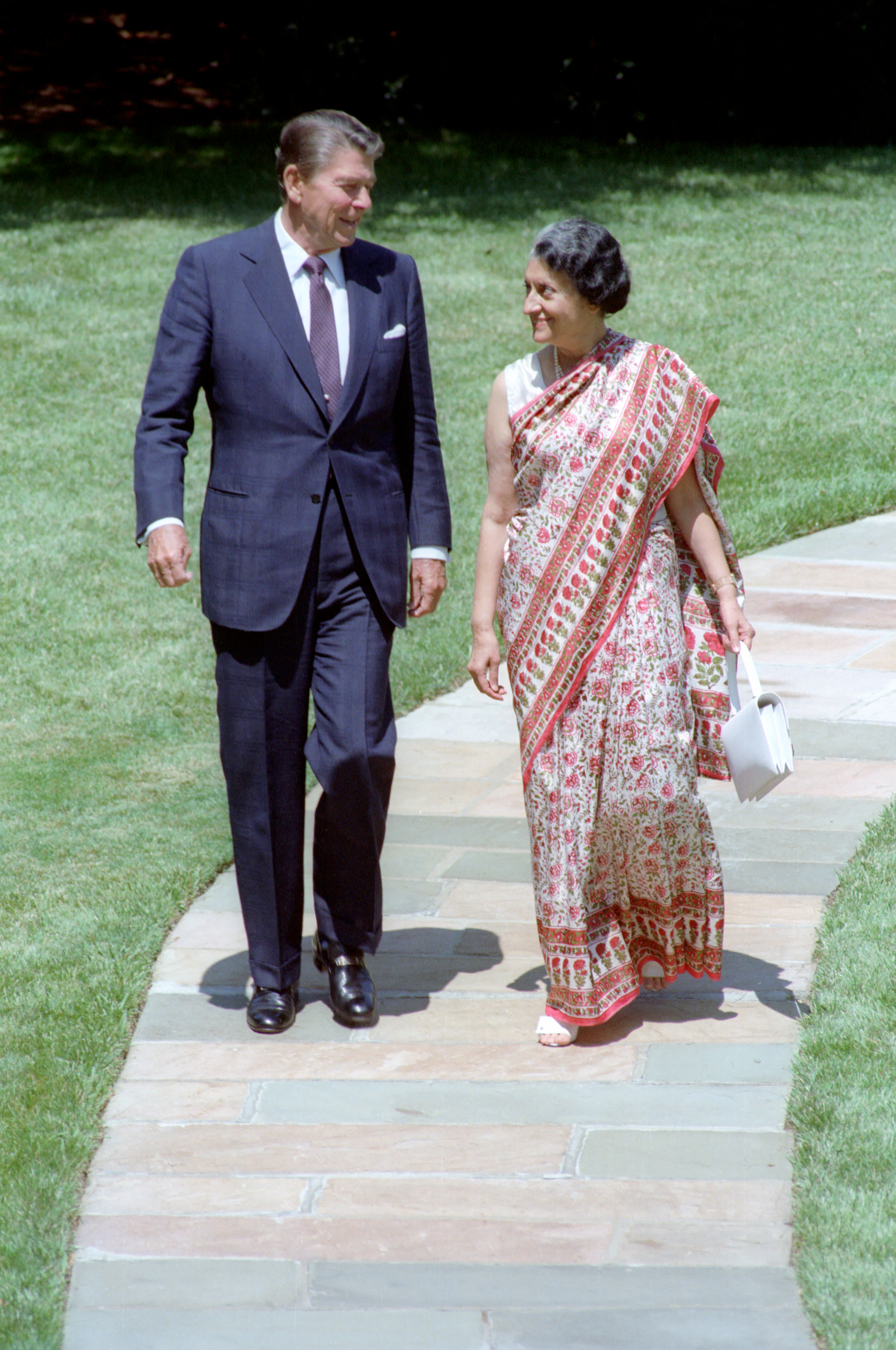
President Reagan walking with Indira outside the oval office

When Indira came to power in 1966, on invitation from the American president Lyndon B. Johnson, Gandhi visited the US on 28 March 1966. During her visit, the Indo-US Education Foundation was formulated, but could not materialize due to strong opposition in India. America had suspended aid to India in 1965 at the time of the Indo-Pak war. However, the visit helped India secure more food and development aid from the US. Johnson promised three million tons of food and nine million in aid. Indira resented the US policy of food aid as a tool in forcing India to adopt policies favored by the US. She also resolutely refused to sign the NPT (Treaty on the Non-Proliferation of Nuclear Weapons).

Relations with US strained badly under President Richard Nixon when India signed the treaty of peace, Friendship and Co-operation with the Soviet Union in 1971. Nixon's favoring of Pakistan during the Bangladesh Liberation War vehemently criticised India for interfering with the internal affairs of Pakistan. He despised Indira politically and personally Nixon ordered complete stoppage of economic assistance and supply of defence equipment to India. Gandhi remained resolute in her support to Bangladesh, despite US attempts to force India to commit to a ceasefire. Opposition leaders, including Atal Bihari Vajpayee in the Lok Sabha and S.N. Mishra in the Rajya Sabha, condemned then US president Richard Nixon's "anti-India statements" in Parliament. Other Jan Sangh leaders including L.K. Advani, Balraj Madhok and Kidar Nath Sahani led demonstrations outside the US Embassy.

The Pokhran Test had driven a wedge in the Indo-US relations. United states reacted negatively, especially in light of then ongoing negotiations on the Nuclear Non-Proliferation Treaty and the economic aid the US had provided to India. This issue caused a stalemate in the relations between the two countries. However, the United States concluded that the test did not violate any agreement and proceeded with a June 1974 shipment of enriched uranium for the Tarapur reactor. The visit of Henry Kissinger, the secretary of the state of the US, to India in October 1974, helped to bridge the gap between the two countries, Gandhi's imposition of emergency in 1975 also strained the Indo-US relations.

Indira met then US president Ronald Reagan in 1981 for the first time at the North–South Summit held to discuss global poverty. Gandhi's 1982 visit, at then US president Ronald Reagan’s invitation, turned out to be markedly successful, with agreeing on cooperation in science and technology and signing an agreement on the Tarapur nuclear plant and to mark 1985 as the ‘year of India’ in the US.

== Soviet Union ==
The relationship between India and the Soviet Union deepened during Gandhi's rule. The main reason was the perceived bias of United States and China, the rivals of USSR, towards Pakistan. The support of the Soviets with arms supplies and casting of veto at United Nations helped in winning and consolidating the victory over Pakistan in the 1971 Bangladesh liberation war. Prior to the war Indira signed a treaty of friendship with the Soviets. In the beginning, India was not willing for Indo-Soviet treaty. But circumstances forced India to have a treaty with the Soviet Union in 1971. The circumstances were I. Pindi-Peking -Washington axis was formed by 1971, mainly against the USSR to curb its influence in South Asia and secondarily against India. The refuges from East Pakistan flooded India. So, the responsibility fell on India to protect East Pakistan against the West Pakistan. At this juncture, China and USA came to support Pakistan and at his situation India was forced to have a treaty with the Soviet Union. Had India not concluded a treaty with USSR, its prestige would have been at stake.

The Soviets were not happy with the 1974 nuclear test conducted by India but did not support further action because of the ensuing Cold War with the United States. Indira was not happy with the Soviet invasion of Afghanistan but once again calculations involving relations with Pakistan and China kept from criticizing the Soviet Union harshly. The Soviets became the main arms supplier during the Indira years by offering cheap credit and transactions in rupees rather than in dollars. The easy trade deals also applied to non-military goods. Under Indira by the early 1980s the Soviets became the largest trading partner of India.

== Pakistan, Bangladesh and South Asia ==
In early 1971, disputed elections in Pakistan led the then East Pakistan to declare independence as Bangladesh. Repression and violence by the Pakistani army led 10 million refugees to cross border in to India over the coming months. Finally in December 1971, Gandhi directly intervened in the conflict to liberate Bangladesh. India emerged victorious in the resulting conflict to become the dominant power of South Asia. India had signed a treaty with the Soviet Union promising mutual assistance in the case of war, while Pakistan received active support from the United States during the conflict. U.S. president Richard Nixon disliked Gandhi personally, referring to her as a "witch" and "clever fox" in his private communication with Secretary of State Henry Kissinger. Nixon later wrote of the war: "[Gandhi] suckered [America]. Suckered us.....this woman suckered us.". Relations with the U.S. became distant as Gandhi developed closer ties with the Soviet Union after the war. The latter grew to become India's largest trading partner and its biggest arms supplier for much of Gandhi's premiership. India's new hegemonic position as articulated under the "Indira Doctrine" led to attempts to bring the Himalayan states under the Indian sphere of influence. Nepal and Bhutan remained aligned with India, while in 1975, after years of building up support, Gandhi incorporated Sikkim into India, after a referendum in which a majority of Sikkimese voted to join India. This was denounced as a "despicable act" by China.

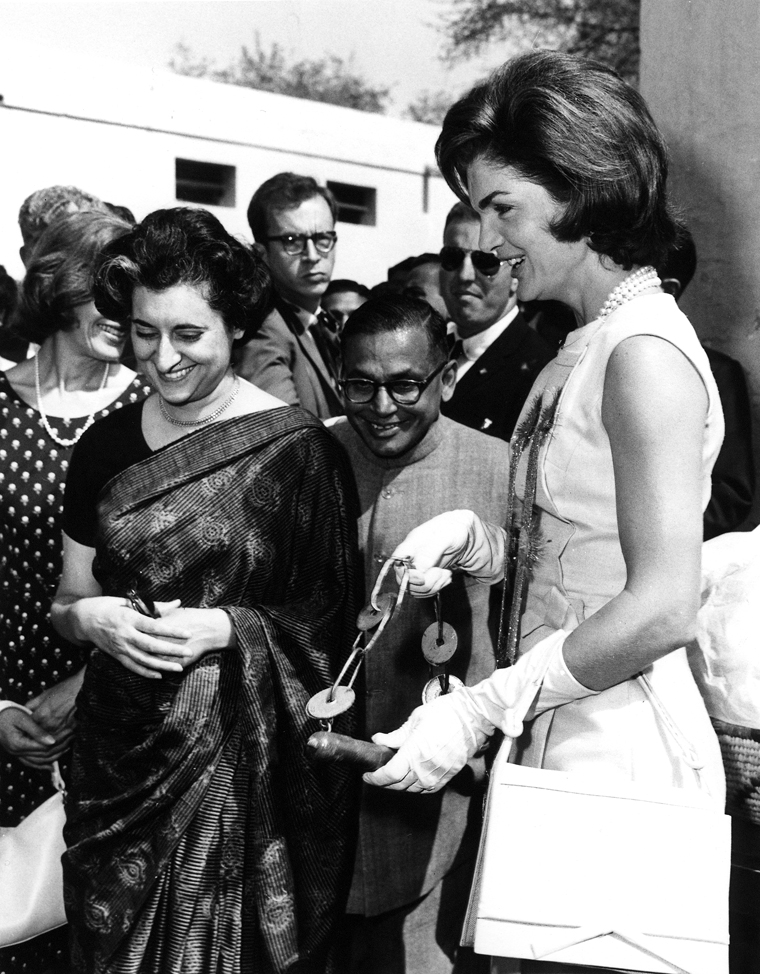
Indira Gandhi with Jacqueline Kennedy in New Delhi, 1962

India maintained close ties with neighbouring Bangladesh (formerly East Pakistan) following the Liberation War. Prime Minister Sheikh Mujibur Rahman recognized Gandhi's contributions to the independence of Bangladesh. However, Mujibur Rahman's pro-India policies antagonised many in Bangladeshi politics and the military, who feared that Bangladesh had become a client state of India. The Assassination of Mujibur Rahman in 1975 led to the establishment of Islamist military regimes that sought to distance the country from India. Gandhi's relationship with the military regimes was strained, due to her alleged support of anti-Islamist leftist guerrilla forces in Bangladesh. Generally, however, there was a rapprochement between Gandhi and the Bangladeshi regimes, although issues such as border disputes and the Farakka Dam remained an irritant in bilateral ties. In 2011, the Government of Bangladesh conferred its highest state award posthumously on Gandhi for her "outstanding contribution" to the country's independence.

Gandhi's approach to dealing with Sri Lanka's ethnic problems was initially accommodating. She enjoyed cordial relations with Prime Minister Sirimavo Bandaranaike. In 1974, India ceded the tiny islet of Katchatheevu to Sri Lanka to save Bandaranaike's socialist government from a political disaster. However, relations soured over Sri Lanka's turn away from socialism under J. R. Jayewardene, whom Gandhi despised as a "western puppet." India under Gandhi was alleged to have supported LTTE militants in the 1980s to put pressure on Jayewardene to abide by Indian interests. Nevertheless, Gandhi rejected demands to invade Sri Lanka in the aftermath of Black July 1983, an anti-Tamil pogrom carried out by Sinhalese mobs. Gandhi made a statement emphasizing that she stood for the territorial integrity of Sri Lanka, although she also stated that India cannot "remain a silent spectator to any injustice done to the Tamil community."

India's relationship with Pakistan remained strained following the Shimla Accord in 1972. Gandhi's authorization of the detonation of a nuclear device at Pokhran in 1974 was viewed by Pakistani leader Zulfikar Ali Bhutto as an attempt to intimidate Pakistan into accepting India's hegemony in the subcontinent. However, in May 1976, Gandhi and Bhutto both agreed to reopen diplomatic establishments and normalize relations. Following the rise to power of General Muhammad Zia-ul-Haq in Pakistan in 1978, India's relations with its neighbour reached a nadir. Gandhi accused General Zia of supporting Khalistani militants in Punjab. Military hostilities recommenced in 1984 following Gandhi's authorization of Operation Meghdoot. India was victorious in the resulting Siachen conflict against Pakistan.

To keep the Soviet Union and the United States out of South Asia, Mrs Gandhi was instrumental in establishing the South Asian Association for Regional Cooperation (SAARC) in 1983

== Middle East ==
Gandhi remained a staunch supporter of Palestinians in the Arab–Israeli conflict and was critical of the Middle East diplomacy sponsored by the United States. Israel was viewed as a religious state and thus an analogue to India's archrival Pakistan. Indian diplomats also hoped to win Arab support in countering Pakistan in Kashmir. Nevertheless, Gandhi authorized the development of a secret channel of contact and security assistance with Israel in the late 1960s. Her lieutenant, P. V. Narasimha Rao, later became Prime Minister and approved full diplomatic ties with Israel in 1992.

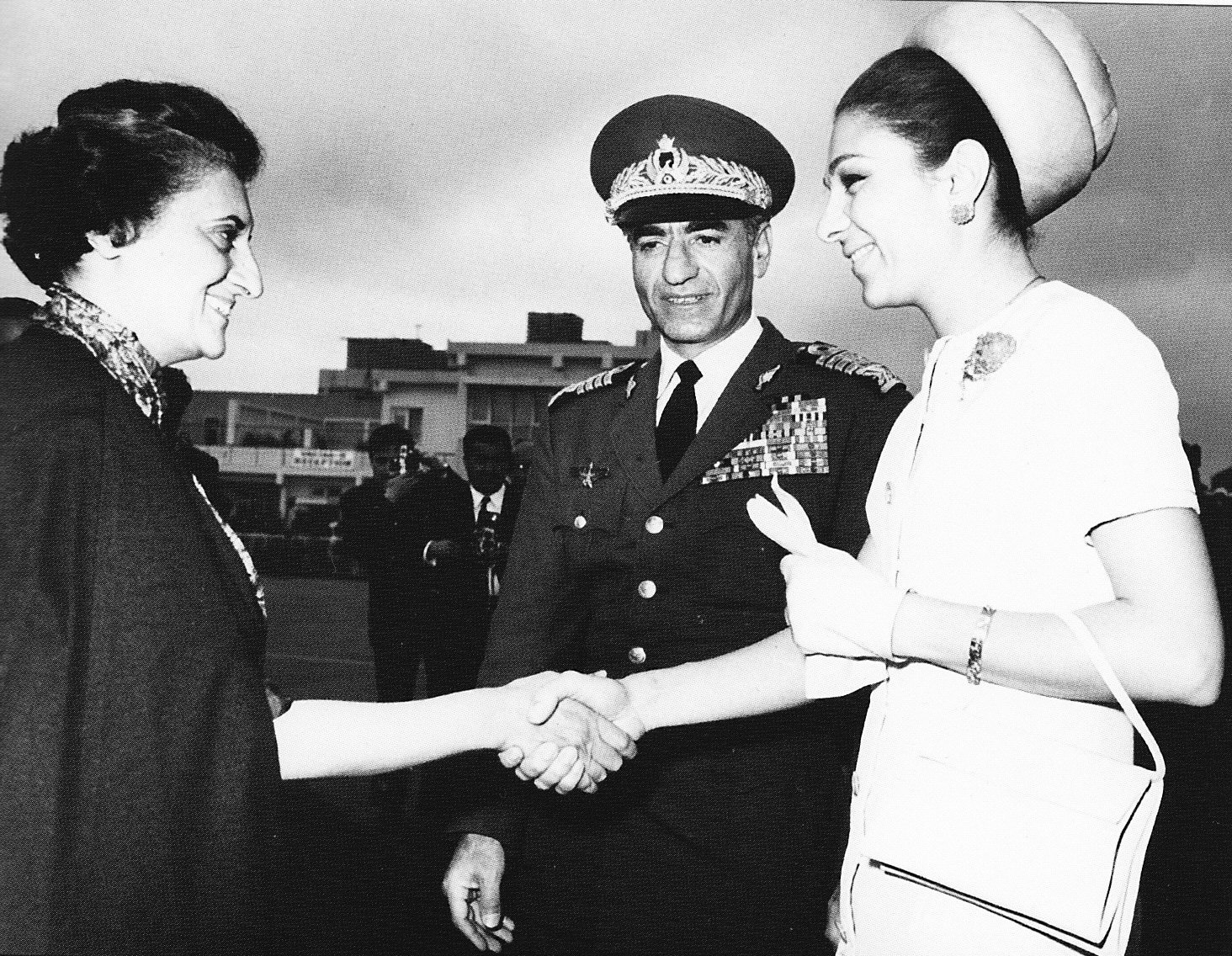
Indira Gandhi meeting the Shah of Iran Mohammad Reza Pahlavi and Shahbanu Farah Pahlavi during their state visit to India in 1970

India's pro-Arab policy had mixed success. Establishment of close ties with the socialist and secular Baathist regimes to some extent neutralized Pakistani propaganda against India. However, the Indo-Pakistani War of 1971 put the Arab and Muslim states of the Middle East in a dilemma as the war was fought by two states both friendly to the Arabs. The progressive Arab regimes in Egypt, Syria, and Algeria chose to remain neutral, while the conservative pro-American Arab monarchies in Jordan, Saudi Arabia, Kuwait, and United Arab Emirates openly supported Pakistan. Egypt's stance was met with dismay by the Indians, who had come to expect close co-operation with the Baathist regimes. But, the death of Nasser in 1970 and Sadat's growing friendship with Riyadh, and his mounting differences with Moscow, constrained Egypt to a policy of neutrality. Gandhi's overtures to Muammar Gaddafi were rebuffed. Libya agreed with the Arab monarchies in believing that Gandhi's intervention in East Pakistan was an attack against Islam.

The 1971 war temporarily became a stumbling block in growing Indo-Iranian ties. Although Iran had earlier characterized the Indo-Pakistani war in 1965 as Indian aggression, the Shah had launched an effort at rapprochement with India in 1969 as part of his effort to secure support for a larger Iranian role in the Persian Gulf. Gandhi's tilt towards Moscow and her dismemberment of Pakistan was perceived by the Shah as part of a larger anti-Iran conspiracy involving India, Iraq, and the Soviet Union. Nevertheless, Iran had resisted Pakistani pressure to activate the Baghdad Pact and draw in the Central Treaty Organisation (CENTO) into the conflict. Gradually, Indian and Iranian disillusionment with their respective regional allies led to a renewed partnership between the nations. Gandhi was unhappy with the lack of support from India's Arab allies during the war with Pakistan, while the Shah was apprehensive at the growing friendship between Pakistan and Arab states of the Persian Gulf, specially Saudi Arabia, and the growing influence of Islam in Pakistani society. There was an increase in Indian economic and military co-operation with Iran during the 1970s. The 1974 India-Iranian agreement led to Iran supplying nearly 75 percent of India's crude oil demands. Gandhi appreciated the Shah's disregard of Pan-Islamism in diplomacy.

== Asia-Pacific ==
One of the major developments in Southeast Asia during Gandhi's premiership was the formation of the Association of Southeast Asian Nations (ASEAN) in 1967. Relations between ASEAN and India was mutually antagonistic. ASEAN in the Indian perception was linked to the Southeast Asia Treaty Organization (SEATO), and it was therefore, seen as a pro-American organisation. On their part, the ASEAN nations were unhappy with Gandhi's sympathy for the Viet Cong and India's strong links with the USSR. Furthermore, they were also apprehensions in the region about Gandhi's future plans, particularly after India played a big role in breaking up Pakistan and facilitating in the emergence of Bangladesh as a sovereign country in 1971. India's entry into the nuclear weapons club in 1974 contributed to tensions in Southeast Asia. Relations only began to improve following Gandhi's endorsement of the ZOPFAN declaration and the disintegration of the SEATO alliance in the aftermath of Pakistani and American defeats in the region. Nevertheless, Gandhi's close relations with reunified Vietnam and her decision to recognize the Vietnam installed Government of Cambodia in 1980 meant that India and ASEAN were not able to develop a viable partnership.

On 26 September 1981, Indira was conferred with the Honorary Degree of Doctor at the Laucala Graduation at the University of the South Pacific in Fiji.

== Africa ==
Although independent India was initially viewed as a champion of anti-colonialism, its cordial relationship with the Commonwealth of Nations and liberal views of British colonial policies in East Africa had harmed its image as a staunch supporter of the anti-colonial movements. Indian condemnation of militant struggles in Kenya and Algeria was in sharp contrast to China, who had supported armed struggle to win African independence. After reaching a high diplomatic point in the aftermath of Nehru's role in the Suez Crisis, India's isolation from Africa was complete when only four nations; Ethiopia, Kenya, Nigeria and Libya supported her during the Sino-Indian War in 1962. After Gandhi became Prime Minister, diplomatic and economic relations with the states which had sided with India during the Sino-Indian War were expanded. Gandhi began negotiations with the Kenyan government to establish the Africa-India Development Cooperation. The Indian government also started considering the possibility of bringing Indians settled in Africa within the framework of its policy goals to help recover its declining geo-strategic influence. Gandhi declared the people of Indian origin settled in Africa as "Ambassadors of India." Efforts to rope in the Asian community to join Indian diplomacy, however, came to naught, partly because of the unwillingness of Indians to remain in politically insecure surroundings and partly due to the exodus of African Indians to Britain with the passing of the Commonwealth Immigrants Act in 1968. In Uganda, the African Indian community even suffered persecution and eventually expulsion under the government of Idi Amin.

Foreign and domestic policy successes in the 1970s enabled Gandhi to rebuild India's image in the eyes of African states. Victory over Pakistan and India's possession of nuclear weapons showed the degree of India's progress. Furthermore, the conclusion of the Indo-Soviet treaty in 1971 and threatening gestures by the major western power, the United States, to send its nuclear armed Task Force 74 into the Bay of Bengal at the height of the East Pakistan crisis had enabled India to regain its anti-imperialist image. Gandhi firmly tied Indian anti-imperialist interests in Africa to those of the Soviet Union. Unlike Nehru, she openly and enthusiastically supported liberation struggles in Africa. At the same time, Chinese influence in Africa had declined owing to its incessant quarrels with the Soviet Union. These developments permanently halted India's decline in Africa and helped reestablish its geo-strategic presence.

== The Commonwealth ==
Indira Gandhi on a visit to Brazil, 1968, National Archives of Brazil

The Commonwealth is voluntary association of mainly former British colonies. India maintained cordial relations with most of the members during Indira Gandhi's time in power. In the 1980s, Indira Gandhi along with Canadian prime minister Pierre Trudeau, Zambia's president Kenneth Kaunda, Australian prime minister Malcolm Fraser and Singapore Prime Minister Lee Kuan Yew was regarded as one of the pillars of the commonwealth India under Indira also hosted the 1983 Commonwealth heads of Government summit in New Delhi in 1983. Gandhi used to use the Commonwealth meetings as a forum to put pressure on member countries to cut economic, sports, and cultural ties with Apartheid South Africa

== Western Europe ==
Indira spent a number of years in Europe during her youth and formed many friendships during her stay there. During her premiership she formed friendships with many leaders such as West German chancellor, Willy Brandt and Austrian chancellor Bruno Kreisky. She also enjoyed closed working relationship with many British leaders including conservative premiers, Edward Heath and Margaret Thatcher.

== See also ==
- List of international prime ministerial trips made by Indira Gandhi
