= List of international prime ministerial trips made by P. V. Narasimha Rao =

This is a list of international prime ministerial trips made by P. V. Narasimha Rao during his tenure as the Prime Minister of India from June 1991 and May 1996. The first overseas visit was to Germany in September 1991.

== Summary of international trips ==
In his five-year long tenure as the Prime Minister, P. V. Narasimha Rao made 32 international trips, visiting 39 countries, including visits to the United States to attend the United Nations General Assembly.

Prime Minister P. V. Narasimha Rao's visits by country
Number of visits	Country
1 visit (34)	Argentina, Bangladesh, Bhutan, Brazil, Burkina Faso, Colombia, Denmark, Egypt, Ghana, Indonesia, Iran, Japan, Kazakhstan, Kyrgyzstan, Malaysia, Maldives, Mauritius, Nepal, Oman, Portugal, Russia, Senegal, Singapore, South Korea, Spain, Sri Lanka, Tunisia, Turkmenistan, Thailand, United Kingdom, Uzbekistan, Venezuela, Vietnam, Zimbabwe
2 visits (3)	China, Germany, Switzerland
3 visits (2)	France, United States

== 1991 ==
	Country	Areas visited	Date(s)	Purpose	Notes
1	Germany	Bonn	September		
2	Zimbabwe	Harare	October	1991 Commonwealth Heads of Government Meeting	
3	France		November		
3	Venezuela	Caracas	November	2nd G15 summit	
4	Sri Lanka	Colombo	December	6th SAARC summit	

== 1992 ==
	Country	Areas visited	Date(s)	Purpose	Notes
5	United NationsUnited States	New York City	January	UN Security Council meeting	Met with President George H. W. Bush during a United Nations Security Council summit in New York City.
6	Switzerland	Davos	2 February		
7	Mauritius	Port Louis	March	Chief guest on the occasion Mauritius proclaiming itself a republic	
8	Brazil	Rio de Janeiro	3–14 June	Earth Summit	
8	Spain	Madrid	14 June	Transit visit	
8	Portugal	Lisbon	15 June	Transit visit	
9	Japan	Tokyo	22–26 June		
10	Indonesia	Jakarta	September	10th NAM summit	
11	France	Paris	28–30 September		
12	Nepal	Kathmandu	19–21 October		
13	Tunisia	Tunis	20 November		On his way to Dakar to attend G-15 Summit, Rao stopped in Tunis on 20 November.
13	Senegal	Dakar	21–23 November	3rd G-15 summit	

== 1993 ==
	Country	Areas visited	Date(s)	Purpose	Notes
14	Bangladesh	Dhaka	10–11 April	7th SAARC summit	
14	Thailand	Bangkok	April		
15	Uzbekistan		23–25 May		
15	Kazakhstan		25–26 May		
16	Oman	Muscat	June		
17	Bhutan		21–22 August		
18	South Korea	Seoul	9–11 September		
18	China	Beijing	September		
19	Iran	Tehran	20–23 September		

== 1994 ==
	Country	Areas visited	Date(s)	Purpose	Notes
20	Switzerland	Davos	1 February	World Economic Forum	
20	Germany		2–5 February		
21	United Kingdom		13–16 March		
22	United States		14–20 May		
23	China		June	Inauguration of the Festival of India in China	
24	Russia		29 June–2 July		
25	Vietnam		September		
25	Singapore		September		

== 1995 ==
	Country	Areas visited	Date(s)	Purpose	Notes
26	Denmark	Copenhagen	8–11 March	World Summit for Social Development and State visit	
27	Maldives	Malé	April		
28	France		11–14 June		
29	Malaysia		August		
30	Turkmenistan		19–21 September		
30	Kyrgyzstan		21–23 September		
31	Egypt		15–16 October		
31	Colombia	Cartagena	16–20 October	11th NAM summit	
31	United NationsUnited States	New York City	October	United Nations General Assembly	
32	Argentina	Buenos Aires	5–7 November	5th G15 summit	
32	Burkina Faso		November		
32	Ghana		November		

== See also ==
- List of international trips made by prime ministers of India
- History of Indian foreign relations
