= BIST =

BIST may refer to:

- Bansal Institute of Science and Technology
- Busan Institute of Science and Technology
- British International School of Tunis
- Built-in self-test
- Borsa Istanbul
- Department for Business, Innovation, Science and Trade, a UK government department
