= List of international prime ministerial trips made by Morarji Desai =

This is a list of international prime ministerial trips made by Morarji Desai during his tenure as the Prime Minister of India from March 1977 and July 1979. The first overseas visit was to Iran in June 1977.

== Summary of international trips ==
In his two-year long tenure as the Prime Minister, Morarji Desai made 9 international trips, visiting 15 countries, including visits to the United States to attend the United Nations General Assembly.

Prime Minister Morarji Desai's visits by country
Number of visits	Country
1 visit (12)	Australia, Bangladesh, Belgium, Czechoslovakia, France, Kenya, Nepal, Poland, Sri Lanka, United States, West Germany, Yugoslavia
2 visits (2)	Iran, Soviet Union, United Kingdom

== 1977 ==
	Country	Areas visited	Date(s)	Purpose	Notes
1	Iran	Tehran	7 June		
1	United Kingdom	London	8–15 June	4th Commonwealth Heads of Government Meeting	
1	France	Paris	June		
2	Soviet Union	Moscow	October		
3	Nepal	Kathmandu	November–December		

== 1978 ==
	Country	Areas visited	Date(s)	Purpose	Notes
4	Australia	Sydney	February	Regional Commonwealth Conference	
5	Iran	Tehran	June	Stop-over	
5	Belgium	Brussels	June		
5	United Kingdom	London	June		
5	United NationsUnited States	New York City, San Francisco, Omaha	12–15 June	United Nations General Assembly	
6	Kenya	Nairobi	August	State funeral of Jomo Kenyatta	

== 1979 ==
	Country	Areas visited	Date(s)	Purpose	Notes
7	Sri Lanka	Colombo	February	Chief guest on the Sri Lankan Independence Day celebration	
8	Bangladesh	Dhaka	16–18 April		
9	West Germany	Frankfurt	June		
9	Soviet Union	Moscow	10–14 June		
9	Poland	Warsaw	14–16 June		
9	Czechoslovakia	Prague	16–18 June		
9	Yugoslavia	Belgrade	18–21 June		

== See also ==
- Premiership of Morarji Desai
- List of international trips made by prime ministers of India
- History of Indian foreign relations
