= List of international prime ministerial trips made by Jawaharlal Nehru =

The following is a list of international prime ministerial trips made by Jawaharlal Nehru during his tenure as the Prime Minister of India from August 1947 to May 1964. The first overseas visit was to the United States in October 1949.

== Summary of international trips ==
In his sixteen-year long tenure as the Prime Minister, Jawaharlal Nehru made 34 international trips, visiting 42 countries, including visits to the United States to attend the United Nations General Assembly.

Map of international trips made by Jawaharlal Nehru as Prime Minister.

Prime Minister Jawaharlal Nehru's visits by country
Number of visits	Country
1 visit (25)	Austria, Bhutan, Cambodia, Canada, Czechoslovakia, Denmark, Finland, Greece, Iran, Japan, Laos, Malaya, Mexico, Netherlands, North Vietnam, Norway, Poland, Sikkim, South Vietnam, Sudan, Sweden, Switzerland, Thailand, Turkey, West Germany
2 visits (13)	Burma, China, France, Ireland, Italy, Lebanon, Nepal, Nigeria, Pakistan, Soviet Union, Syria, United Kingdom, Yugoslavia
3 visits (2)	Ceylon, Indonesia
4 visits (1)	United States
7 visits (1)	Egypt

== 1949 ==
	Country	Areas visited	Date(s)	Purpose	Notes
1	United States	Washington, D.C., New York City, Chicago, Knoxville, San Francisco, Madison	11–15 October	State visit	
2	Canada	Vancouver	22–26 October	State visit, addressed the Parliament of Canada	
3	Ireland	Curragh Racecourse			

== 1950 ==
	Country	Areas visited	Date(s)	Purpose	Notes
4	Indonesia	Jakarta	June		

== 1951 ==
	Country	Areas visited	Date(s)	Purpose	Notes
5	Nepal		16-18 June		

== 1952 ==
Prime Minister Nehru did not make any international trips in 1952.

== 1953 ==
	Country	Areas visited	Date(s)	Purpose	Notes
6	United Kingdom	London	May	Coronation of Elizabeth II	
7	Egypt		23–25 June		
8	Pakistan	Karachi	25–27 July		
9	Italy				
9	Switzerland	Bürgenstock			

== 1954 ==
	Country	Areas visited	Date(s)	Purpose	Notes
10	Ceylon	Colombo	28 April	Colombo Powers' Conference	
11	North Vietnam	Hanoi	October		
11	South Vietnam	Saigon	October		
11	Laos	Vientiane	October		
11	Cambodia	Phnom Penh, Angkor Wat	October		
11	China	Beijing, Shanghai, Nanjing, Guangzhou, Anshan, Hankow, Mukden, Dairen	19−31 October		
11	United Kingdom	British Hong Kong	October		
12	Burma		December		
12	Thailand		December		
12	Malaya		December		
12	Indonesia	Bogor	29 December	Bogor Conference	

== 1955 ==
	Country	Areas visited	Date(s)	Purpose	Notes
13	Egypt	Cairo	February		
13	France	Paris	February		
14	Indonesia	Bandung	18−24 April	Bandung Conference	
15	Soviet Union	Moscow, Yekaterinburg, Almaty, Ukrainian SSR, Turkmen SSR	7–23 June	State visit	
15	Poland	Warsaw	25–28 June		
15	Yugoslavia	Zenica, Jablanica, Belgrade, Sarajevo, Dubrovnik	June–July		
15	Czechoslovakia		July		
15	Austria		July		
15	Italy	Rome	July		
15	Egypt		July		
15	Saudi Arabia		July	State visit	

== 1956 ==
	Country	Areas visited	Date(s)	Purpose	Notes
16	Ireland		June–July		
16	France		June–July		
16	Yugoslavia		June–July		
16	Greece		June–July		
16	Egypt		June–July		
16	Lebanon		June–July		
16	Syria		July		
16	West Germany	Bonn	14 July		
17	United States	Washington, D.C., Gettysburg	16–20 December	State visit	

== 1957 ==
	Country	Areas visited	Date(s)	Purpose	Notes
18	Ceylon		May		
19	Syria		June		
19	Denmark		June		
19	Finland	Helsinki, Mänttä	June		
19	Norway		June		
19	Sweden		June		
19	Egypt		July		
19	Netherlands		July		
19	Sudan	Khartoum	July		
20	Japan	Tokyo, Hiroshima, Osaka	October		
21	Burma	Rangoon	16−17 October		
22	Nigeria		1957		

== 1958 ==
	Country	Areas visited	Date(s)	Purpose	Notes
23	Sikkim	Gangtok, Nathu La	16 September		
23	Bhutan		September		
24	China	Yatung	October		

== 1959 ==
	Country	Areas visited	Date(s)	Purpose	Notes
25	Nepal		11-14 June		
26	Iran	Tehran	September		

== 1960 ==
	Country	Areas visited	Date(s)	Purpose	Notes
27	Turkey	Istanbul	20–24 May		
27	Lebanon	Beirut	24 May		
28	Egypt	Cairo	17 June		
29	Pakistan	Karachi, Murree, Rawalpindi, Lahore	19–23 September		
30	United NationsUnited States	New York City	26 September	United Nations General Assembly	

== 1961 ==
	Country	Areas visited	Date(s)	Purpose	Notes
31	Soviet Union				
32	United States	Newport, New York City, Los Angeles	6–10 November	State visit	
32	Mexico		14–17 November	State visit	
32	United States	Los Angeles	17 November	State visit	
32	Egypt	Cairo	18 November	Meeting with Gamal Abdel Nasser and Josip Broz Tito	

== 1962 ==
	Country	Areas visited	Date(s)	Purpose	Notes
33	Ceylon			State visit	
34	Nigeria		23–26 September		

== See also ==
- List of international trips made by prime ministers of India
- History of Indian foreign relations
