= List of things named after Lal Bahadur Shastri =

Lal Bahadur Shastri was and Indian independence activist and statesman who served as the second Prime Minister of India from 1964 to 1966. Places and institutions named after him include:

== Airports ==
- Lal Bahadur Shastri International Airport

== Dams ==
- Lal Bahadur Shastri Dam

== Roads ==
- Lal Bahadur Shastri Marg

== Localities ==
- Shastri Nagar, Ahmedabad
- Shastri Nagar, Chennai
- Shastri Nagar, Delhi
  - Shastri Nagar metro station
- Shastri Nagar, Great Nicobar
- Shastri Park
  - Shastri Park metro station

== Stadiums ==
- Lal Bahadur Shastri Stadium, Hyderabad
- Lal Bahadur Shastri Stadium, Kollam

== Educational institutions ==
- Lal Bahadur Shastri College, Jaipur
- Lal Bahadur Shastri College of Advanced Maritime Studies and Research
- Lal Bahadur Shastri Integrated Institute of Science and Technology
- Lal Bahadur Shastri National Academy of Administration
- Shri Lal Bahadur Shastri Government Medical College
- Shri Lal Bahadur Shastri National Sanskrit University

== Others ==
- Lal Bahadur Shastri National Award
- Shastri Bhawan
- Shastri Indo-Canadian Institute

== See also ==
- List of things named after prime ministers of India
