= Bist =

Bist or BIST may refer to:

- Bansal Institute of Science and Technology, in Bhopal, India
- Bharath Institute of Science and Technology, former name of Bharath University, in Chennai, Tamil Nadu, India
- Borsa Istanbul
- Bist (river), on the France-Germany border
- Bist (village), in Azerbaijan
- Built-in self-test, an integrated circuit feature
- Stykkishólmur Airport, ICAO airport code BIST

== See also ==
- Bisht (disambiguation)
