= Death and state funeral of Lal Bahadur Shastri =

Death of Lal Bahadur Shastri
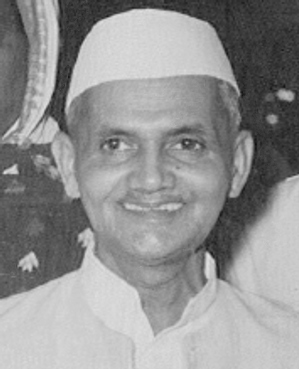
- Shastri in 1966
- Date: 11 January 1966
- Location: Tashkent, Uzbek SSR, Soviet Union
- Type: Sudden death
- Cause: Officially reported as myocardial infarction
- Participants: Lal Bahadur Shastri
- Outcome: Official cause attributed to heart attack; ongoing controversy and demands for investigation

Lal Bahadur Shastri, India’s second Prime Minister, died early 11 January 1966 in Tashkent, then in the Soviet Union. He was 61 and the official cause was reported as a myocardial infarction.

Shastri had been in Tashkent since 4 January 1966 for peace talks brokered by Soviet Premier Alexei Kosygin between India and Pakistan. The Tashkent Declaration was signed on 10 January, and within hours Shastri complained of chest pain and died suddenly in the Soviet-provided villa. News of his death prompted nationwide shock and a state funeral in New Delhi.

Despite the official ruling, the absence of an on-site post-mortem and reports of unexplained marks on his body when it returned to India have led Shastri’s family and some colleagues to question the natural-causes verdict.

Over time, numerous conspiracy theories have arisen, alleging anything from foul play to foreign involvement. RTI requests for related documents have been repeatedly denied by the Prime Minister’s Office on grounds of national security.

Following his death, India observed twelve days of national mourning. His body was flown home on a Soviet aircraft accompanied by Premier Kosygin, and in Tashkent a gun-carriage procession—with Pakistan’s President Ayub Khan as pallbearer—escorted the casket. In New Delhi, the coffin lay in state at Parliament House before a full military funeral on 13 January 1966 at Vijay Ghat. Officers of the three Services fired volleys, army buglers sounded the Last Post, and President Sarvepalli Radhakrishnan led the mourners.

Shastri’s simple state funeral and the establishment of his memorial at Vijay Ghat cemented his reputation for humility and service. His slogan “Jai Jawan, Jai Kisan” (“Hail the soldier, Hail the farmer”) continues to be invoked in India’s public life, symbolizing his dual focus on national defence and agricultural self-reliance.

== See also ==
- Premiership of Lal Bahadur Shastri
- List of things named after Lal Bahadur Shastri
- Indo-Pakistani War of 1965
- Tashkent Agreement
- List of conspiracy theories
- Right to Information Act, 2005
