= List of international prime ministerial trips made by Indira Gandhi =

The following is a list of international prime ministerial trips made by Indira Gandhi during her tenure as the Prime Minister of India from January 1966 to March 1977, and again from January 1980 to October 1984. The first overseas visit was a stopover to France on her way to the United States in March 1966.

== Summary of international trips ==
In her sixteen-year long tenure as the Prime Minister, Indira Gandhi made 52 international trips, visiting 69 countries, including visits to the United States to attend the United Nations General Assembly.

Map of international trips made by Indira Gandhi as Prime Minister.

One visit
Two visits
Three visits
Four visits
Five visits
Six visits
Seven or more visits
India

Prime Minister Indira Gandhi's visits by country
Number of visits	Country
1 visit (46)	Algeria, Argentina, Bangladesh, Belgium, Brazil, Canada, Chile, Colombia, Czechoslovakia, Denmark, East Germany, Fiji, Finland, Greece, Guyana, Hungary, Iran, Iraq, Italy, Jamaica, Kuwait, Lebanon, Libya, Malaysia, Maldives, Mexico, Mozambique, New Zealand, Norway, Philippines, Poland, Saudi Arabia, Sikkim, Singapore, Sweden, Switzerland, Thailand, Tonga, Trinidad and Tobago, Tunisia, United Arab Emirates, Uruguay, Vatican City, Venezuela, West Germany, Zimbabwe
2 visits (14)	Afghanistan, Australia, Austria, Bhutan, Bulgaria, Burma, Cyprus, Indonesia, Japan, Kenya, Nepal, Romania, Tanzania, Zambia
3 visits (4)	Mauritius, Seychelles, Sri Lanka, United Arab Republic
5 visits (3)	France, United Kingdom, Yugoslavia
6 visits (1)	United States
9 visits (1)	Soviet Union

== 1966 ==
	Country	Areas visited	Date(s)	Purpose	Notes
1	France	Paris	25–26 March		Stop-over in Paris on her way to Washington. Met President de Gaulle at the Elysee Palace and Prime Minister Pompidou.
1	United States	Williamsburg, New York City	27 March–1 April	Official visit	Met President Johnson at the White House.
1	United Kingdom	London	2 April		Brief stop-over in London. Met PM Wilson.
1	Soviet Union	Moscow	3 April		Stopped for a day in Moscow. Met Chairman Alexei Kosygin.
2	United Arab Republic	Cairo	8–9 July		Met President Gamal Abdel Nasser at the Koubbeh Palace in Cairo.
2	Yugoslavia	Brijuni	10–11 July		Met President Josip Broz Tito at his retreat villa in the Brioni Islands in the Adriatic Sea.
2	Soviet Union	Moscow	12–16 July		
3	Nepal	Kathmandu	4–7 October		

== 1967 ==
	Country	Areas visited	Date(s)	Purpose	Notes
4	Ceylon	Colombo	18–21 September	Goodwill visit	
5	Poland	Warsaw	8–11 October	Official Visit	
5	Yugoslavia	Belgrade	11–13 October	Official Visit	Welcomed at the airport by President Tito.
5	Bulgaria	Sofia	13–16 October	Official Visit	First visit by an Indian Prime Minister to Bulgaria. Welcomed at the airport by General Secretary Todor Zhivkov.
5	Romania	Bucharest	16–19 October	Official Visit	Met with General Secretary Nicolae Ceauşescu.
5	United Arab Republic		19–21 October		
6	Soviet Union	Moscow	6–8 November	50th Anniversary of the October Revolution	Attended the October Revolution Parade.

== 1968 ==
	Country	Areas visited	Date(s)	Purpose	Notes
7	Bhutan		3–5 May		
7	Sikkim		5–6 May		
8	Singapore		20–21 May		
8	Australia	Canberra, Sydney, Melbourne	21–27 May	Official Visit	First visit by an Indian Prime Minister to Australia. Visited the Australian War Memorial. Attended a luncheon hosted in her honor by Prime Minister John Gorton at Parliament House, Canberra. Visited the Taronga Zoo in Sydney. Attended a dinner hosted in her honor at the University of Melbourne by Chancellor of the university and former PM Robert Menzies. Given the ideological differences and divergence of strategic interests between India and Australia at that time, it was reported that the visit was high on pageantry but devoid of much substance.
8	New Zealand	Wellington	27–29 May	Official Visit	First visit by an Indian Prime Minister to New Zealand. Attended a luncheon hosted in her honor at Parliament House, Wellington. Visited the Dominion Museum.
8	Malaysia	Kuala Lumpur	29 May–1 June		
8	Burma	Rangoon	1 June	Stop-over	
9	Brazil		23–27 September		During this South American tour, there was also a plan to visit Peru, which had to be cancelled due to the 1968 Peruvian coup d'état, which happened just before PM Gandhi was about to arrive in Lima.
9	Uruguay	Montevideo	27–28 September		During this South American tour, there was also a plan to visit Peru, which had to be cancelled due to the 1968 Peruvian coup d'état, which happened just before PM Gandhi was about to arrive in Lima.
9	Argentina	Buenos Aires	29– September		During this South American tour, there was also a plan to visit Peru, which had to be cancelled due to the 1968 Peruvian coup d'état, which happened just before PM Gandhi was about to arrive in Lima.
9	Chile	Santiago	8– October		During this South American tour, there was also a plan to visit Peru, which had to be cancelled due to the 1968 Peruvian coup d'état, which happened just before PM Gandhi was about to arrive in Lima.
9	Colombia	Bogotá			During this South American tour, there was also a plan to visit Peru, which had to be cancelled due to the 1968 Peruvian coup d'état, which happened just before PM Gandhi was about to arrive in Lima.
9	Venezuela	Caracas	10–11 October		During this South American tour, there was also a plan to visit Peru, which had to be cancelled due to the 1968 Peruvian coup d'état, which happened just before PM Gandhi was about to arrive in Lima.
9	Trinidad and Tobago	Port of Spain	11–12 October		During this South American tour, there was also a plan to visit Peru, which had to be cancelled due to the 1968 Peruvian coup d'état, which happened just before PM Gandhi was about to arrive in Lima.
9	Guyana		12–13 October		During this South American tour, there was also a plan to visit Peru, which had to be cancelled due to the 1968 Peruvian coup d'état, which happened just before PM Gandhi was about to arrive in Lima.
9	United Nations United States	New York City	14 October	United Nations General Assembly	

== 1969 ==
	Country	Areas visited	Date(s)	Purpose	Notes
10	United Kingdom	London	7–10 January	Commonwealth Prime Ministers Conference	
11	Burma	Rangoon	27–30 March		Met with the Chairman of the Revolutionary Council of Burma General Ne Win.
12	Afghanistan	Kabul	5–10 June		
13	Japan		23–28 June		
13	Indonesia		28 June–3 July	State visit	
13	Thailand		3 July	Stop-over	

== 1970 ==
	Country	Areas visited	Date(s)	Purpose	Notes
14	Mauritius	Port Louis, Saint Pierre	2–6 June	State visit	
15	Zambia	Lusaka	8–10 September	3rd Summit of the Non-aligned Movement	
15	Kenya	Nairobi	September		
16	Soviet Union	Moscow	20 October		Made a brief stop-over in Moscow en-route to the UNGA.
16	United NationsUnited States	New York City	21–25 October	United Nations General Assembly	Special UN General Assembly Session celebrating the 25th anniversary of the signing of the UN Charter.
16	United Arab Republic	Cairo	26 October		Eight hour visit, partially in personal capacity owing to the recent death of President Gamal Abdel Nasser.
17	France	Paris	12 November	Funeral of Charles de Gaulle	

== 1971 ==
	Country	Areas visited	Date(s)	Purpose	Notes
18	Soviet Union		27–29 September		
19	Lebanon	Beirut	24 October		Made a brief halt in Beirut on her way to Europe.
19	Belgium		24–25 October		
19	Austria		October–November		
19	United Kingdom	London	28 October–3 November		
19	United States	Washington DC, New York City	3–6 November	Official visit	
19	France		7–10 November		
19	West Germany	Bonn	10–12 November		

== 1972 ==
	Country	Areas visited	Date(s)	Purpose	Notes
20	Bangladesh		17–19 March		
21	Sweden		13–17 June	Official visit	
21	Czechoslovakia		17–20 June		
21	Hungary	Budapest	20–23 June		
22	Bhutan	Kurjey Lhakhang	28 October	Cremation of King Jigme Dorji Wangchuck	

== 1973 ==
	Country	Areas visited	Date(s)	Purpose	Notes
23	Nepal	Kathmandu	7–10 February	Goodwill visit	
24	Sri Lanka		27–29 April	Official visit	
25	Yugoslavia		15–17 June		
25	Canada		17–25 June		Eight day visit, during which she addressed the Parliament of Canada.
25	United Kingdom	London	25 June		On her way back from Canada, made a stopover in London. Held discussions with PM Heath.
26	Algeria	Algiers	5–9 September	4th Summit of the Non-aligned Movement	

== 1974 ==
	Country	Areas visited	Date(s)	Purpose	Notes
27	Iran	Tehran	28 April–2 May	Official visit	

== 1975 ==
	Country	Areas visited	Date(s)	Purpose	Notes
28	Maldives		12–14 January	Official visit	
29	Iraq		18–21 January	Official visit	
30	Jamaica	Kingston	29 April–2 May	1975 Commonwealth Heads of Government Meeting	

== 1976 ==
	Country	Areas visited	Date(s)	Purpose	Notes
31	Soviet Union	Moscow, Yerevan, Tbilisi	8–13 June		First overseas visit since declaration of Emergency in June 1975.
32	East Germany	East Berlin	1–4 July		
32	Afghanistan		4–7 July		
33	Sri Lanka	Colombo	August	5th Summit of the Non-Aligned Movement	
34	Mauritius		8–11 October		
34	Tanzania	Dar-es-Salaam	11–13 October	Official visit	Welcomed by Tanzanian President Julius Nyerere, Prime Minister Rashidi Kawawa and First Vice-President Aboud Jumbe.
34	Zambia	Lusaka	14–17 October		Received by President Kenneth Kaunda.
34	Seychelles		17 October		

== 1980 ==
	Country	Areas visited	Date(s)	Purpose	Notes
35	Tanzania	Dar-es-Salaam, Tanga	16–17 April		Received by President Julius Nyerere.
35	Zimbabwe	Salisbury	18 April	Zimbabwean Independence celebration	
36	Yugoslavia		8 May	Funeral of President Josip Tito	

== 1981 ==
	Country	Areas visited	Date(s)	Purpose	Notes
37	Cyprus	Nicosia? Larnaca?	May	Short technical stop-over	Met with President of Cyprus Spyros Kyprianou.
37	Switzerland	Geneva	6 May	34th World Health Assembly	Attended WHO 34th World Health Assembly. Met with ICRC President Alexandre Hay.
37	Kuwait		May		
37	United Arab Emirates		May		
38	Seychelles		9 August	Transit stop-over	Met with President of Seychelles France-Albert René.
38	Kenya	Nairobi	9–12 August	UN Conference on New and Renewable Sources of Energy	PM Gandhi delivered keynote address at the conference. Met Canadian PM.
39	Indonesia	Jakarta	23–24 September		Welcomed by President Suharto at the airport.
39	Tonga		September		First visit by an Indian Prime Minister.
39	Fiji	Suva, Deuba	26 September		First visit by an Indian Prime Minister.
39	Australia	Melbourne	29 September–7 October	Commonwealth Heads of Government Meeting 1981	
39	Philippines	Manila	8–10 October	Official visit	First visit by an Indian Prime Minister. Greeted by President Fedinand Marcos and First Lady Imelda Marcos at the airport.
40	Romania		18–20 October	Official visit	
40	Mexico	Cancun	21–23 October	North–South Summit	On October 21, met US President Reagan (for the first time), Chinese Prime Minister Zhao Ziyang and President Sergej Kraigher of Yugoslavia.
41	Bulgaria				
41	Italy	Rome	9–12 November	Official visit	First visit by an Indian Prime Minister. Attended a press conference with Italian Prime Minister Giovanni Spadolini. Spoke at the 21st biennial conference of the U.N. Food and Agriculture Organization. Went shopping in the center of Rome.
41	Vatican City		9 November	Personal visit	Met Pope John Paul II accompanied by daughters-in-law Sonia Gandhi and Maneka Gandhi.
41	France	Paris	13– November		Met President François Mitterrand and PM Pierre Mauroy.
42	Seychelles		1981		

== 1982 ==
	Country	Areas visited	Date(s)	Purpose	Notes
43	United Kingdom	London	21–26 March	Inauguration of the Festival of India	
44	Saudi Arabia	Riyadh	18–21 April	Official Visit	First visit by an Indian PM in 26 years (since 1956). Met with King Khalid.
45	United States	New York City, Los Angeles, Honolulu	27 July–4 August	State visit	
45	Japan	Tokyo	5 August		
46	Mauritius		23–25 August		
46	Mozambique	Maputo	26–27 August		
47	Soviet Union	Moscow, Star City, Tallinn, Kiev	19–28 (20–26?)September	State visit	In Star City, visited facilities where Indian astronauts Rakesh Sharma and Ravish Malhotra were training.
48	Soviet Union	Moscow	15 November	Funeral of Leonid Brezhnev	

== 1983 ==
	Country	Areas visited	Date(s)	Purpose	Notes
49	Norway	Oslo	1– June		
49	Yugoslavia		8–9 June	Official visit	
49	Finland	Helsinki	10 June		
49	Denmark				
49	Austria		17–22 June		
50	Cyprus		20–22 September		
50	Greece	Athens, Delphi	22–24 September		
50	France	Paris	September 1983		On her way to New York. Gandhi made a stop over in Paris.
50	United Nations United States	New York City	September 1983	38th UN General Assembly	

== 1984 ==
	Country	Areas visited	Date(s)	Purpose	Notes
51	Soviet Union	Moscow	February 1984	Funeral of Yuri Andropov	
52	Libya		April 1984		
52	Tunisia		April 1984		

== See also ==
- List of international trips made by prime ministers of India
- History of Indian foreign relations
