= List of international trips made by prime ministers of India =

The following is a list of international prime ministerial trips made by prime ministers of India in chronological order.

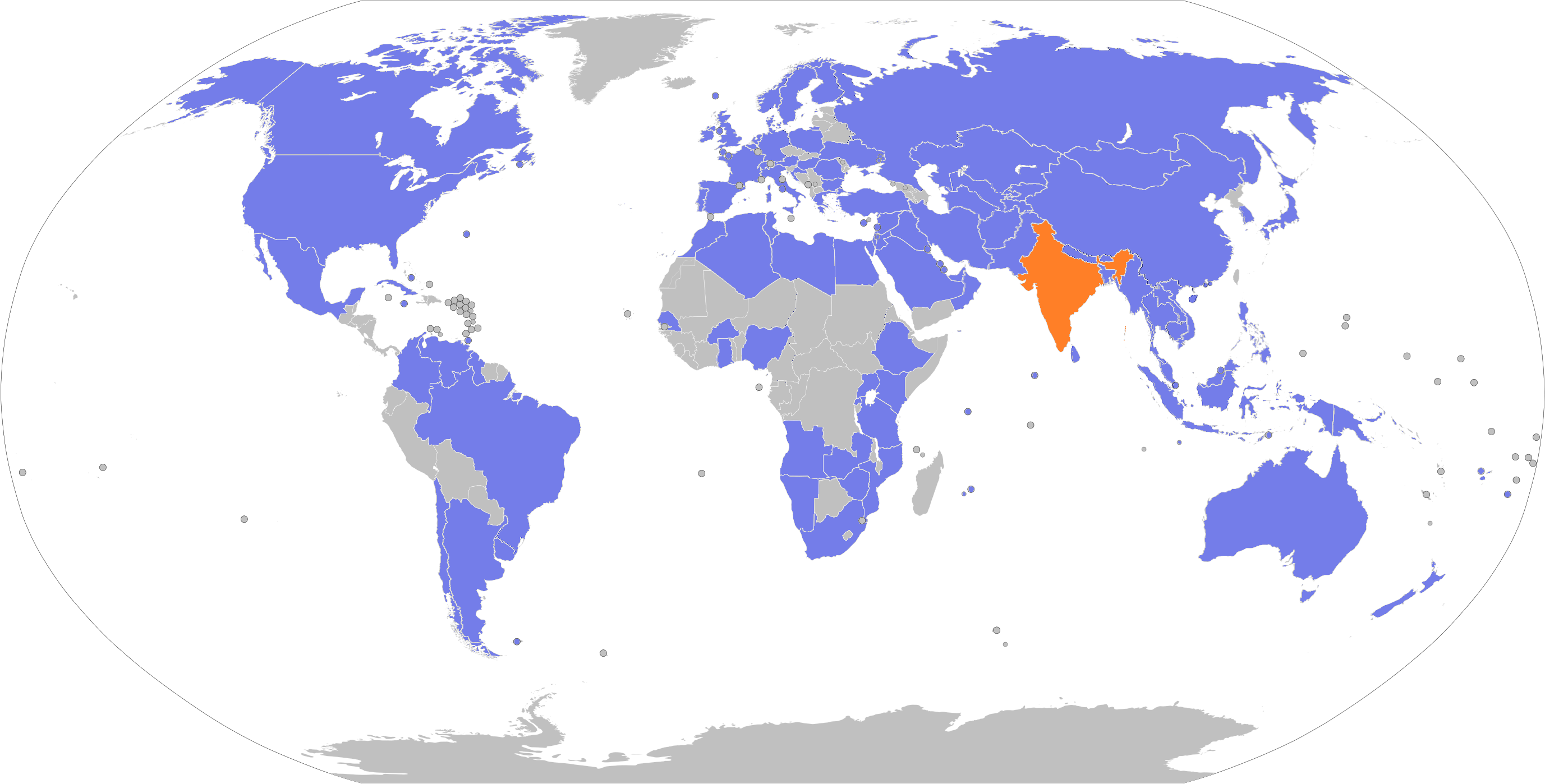
Map of international trips made by prime ministers of India (as of December 2025). Does not include split countries like Soviet Union, Sudan, Czechoslovakia, and Yugoslavia, but past prime ministers did vist the parent country.

== Summary of prime ministers with number of countries visited ==
List of prime ministers with number of countries visited
	Prime minister	Tenure	Number of visits	Number of countries visited
1	Jawaharlal Nehru	1947–1964	34	42
2	Lal Bahadur Shastri	1964–1966	7	8
3	Indira Gandhi	1966–1977, 1980–1984	52	69
4	Morarji Desai	1977–1979	9	15
5	Charan Singh	1979–1980	0	0
6	Rajiv Gandhi	1984–1989	27	41
7	V. P. Singh	1989–1990	4	4
8	Chandra Shekhar	1990–1991	2	2
9	P. V. Narasimha Rao	1991–1996	32	39
10	Atal Bihari Vajpayee	1996, 1998–2004	29	32
11	H. D. Deve Gowda	1996–1997	6	6
12	Inder Kumar Gujral	1997–1998	4	6
13	Manmohan Singh	2004–2014	71	46
14	Narendra Modi	2014–present	105	82

== Jawaharlal Nehru ==
In his sixteen-year long tenure as the Prime Minister, Jawaharlal Nehru made 34 international trips, visiting 42 countries, including visits to the United States to attend the United Nations General Assembly.

Map of international trips made by Jawaharlal Nehru as Prime Minister.

Prime Minister Jawaharlal Nehru's visits by country
Number of visits	Country
1 visit (25)	Austria, Bhutan, Cambodia, Canada, Czechoslovakia, Denmark, Finland, Greece, Iran, Japan, Laos, Malaya, Mexico, Netherlands, North Vietnam, Norway, Poland, Sikkim, South Vietnam, Sudan, Sweden, Switzerland, Thailand, Turkey, West Germany
2 visits (13)	Burma, China, France, Ireland, Italy, Lebanon, Nepal, Nigeria, Pakistan, Soviet Union, Syria, United Kingdom, Yugoslavia
3 visits (2)	Ceylon, Indonesia
4 visits (1)	United States
7 visits (1)	Egypt

== Lal Bahadur Shastri ==
In his two-year long tenure as the Prime Minister, Lal Bahadur Shastri made 7 international trips, visiting 8 countries.

Prime Minister Lal Bahadur Shastri's visits by country
Number of visits	Country
1 visit (7)	Burma, Canada, Egypt, Nepal, Pakistan, United Kingdom, Yugoslavia
2 visits (1)	Soviet Union

== Indira Gandhi ==
In her sixteen-year-long tenure as the prime minister, Indira Gandhi made 52 international trips, visiting 69 countries, including visits to the United States to attend the United Nations General Assembly.

Map of international trips made by Indira Gandhi as Prime Minister.

One visit
Two visits
Three visits
Four visits
Five visits
Six visits
Seven or more visits
India

Prime Minister Indira Gandhi's visits by country
Number of visits	Country
1 visit (46)	Algeria, Argentina, Bangladesh, Belgium, Brazil, Canada, Chile, Colombia, Czechoslovakia, Denmark, East Germany, Fiji, Finland, Greece, Guyana, Hungary, Iran, Iraq, Italy, Jamaica, Kuwait, Lebanon, Libya, Malaysia, Maldives, Mexico, Mozambique, New Zealand, Norway, Philippines, Poland, Saudi Arabia, Sikkim, Singapore, Sweden, Switzerland, Thailand, Tonga, Trinidad and Tobago, Tunisia, United Arab Emirates, Uruguay, Vatican City, Venezuela, West Germany, Zimbabwe
2 visits (14)	Afghanistan, Australia, Austria, Bhutan, Bulgaria, Burma, Cyprus, Indonesia, Japan, Kenya, Nepal, Romania, Tanzania, Zambia
3 visits (4)	Mauritius, Seychelles, Sri Lanka, United Arab Republic
5 visits (3)	France, United Kingdom, Yugoslavia
6 visits (1)	United States
9 visits (1)	Soviet Union

== Morarji Desai ==
In his two-year long tenure as the Prime Minister, Morarji Desai made 9 international trips, visiting 15 countries, including visits to the United States to attend the United Nations General Assembly.

Prime Minister Morarji Desai's visits by country
Number of visits	Country
1 visit (12)	Australia, Bangladesh, Belgium, Czechoslovakia, France, Kenya, Nepal, Poland, Sri Lanka, United States, West Germany, Yugoslavia
2 visits (3)	Iran, Soviet Union, United Kingdom

== Charan Singh ==
Charan Singh did not make any international visit as prime minister.

== Rajiv Gandhi ==
In his five-year long tenure as the Prime Minister, Rajiv Gandhi made 27 international trips, visiting 41 countries, including visits to the United States to attend the United Nations General Assembly.

Prime Minister Rajiv Gandhi's visits by country
Number of visits	Country
1 visit (28)	Algeria, Angola, Australia, Bahamas, Burma, Canada, China, Cuba, Czechoslovakia, Egypt, Hungary, Indonesia, Jordan, Maldives, Mauritius, Mexico, New Zealand, Oman, Spain, Sri Lanka, Sweden, Switzerland, Syria, Tanzania, Thailand, Turkey, West Germany, Zambia
2 visits (9)	Bangladesh, Bhutan, France, Nepal, Netherlands, United Kingdom, Vietnam, Yugoslavia, Zimbabwe
3 visits (2)	Japan, Pakistan
4 visits (2)	Soviet Union, United States

== V. P. Singh ==
In his tenure as the Prime Minister, V. P. Singh made 4 international trips, visiting 4 countries.

Prime Minister V. P. Singh's visits by country
Number of visits	Country
1 visit (4)	Malaysia, Maldives, Namibia, Soviet Union

	Country	Areas visited	Date(s)	Purpose	Notes
1	Namibia	Windhoek	March 1990	Namibian Independence Day celebrations	
2	Malaysia	Kuala Lumpur	1–4 June 1990	1st G-15 summit	
3	Maldives	Malé	22–24 June 1990	State visit	
4	Soviet Union	Moscow	July 1990	State visit	

== Chandra Shekhar ==
In his tenure as the Prime Minister, Chandra Shekhar made 2 international trips, visiting 2 countries.

Prime Minister Chandra Shekhar's visits by country
Number of visits	Country
1 visit (2)	Maldives, Nepal

	Country	Areas visited	Date(s)	Purpose	Notes
1	Maldives	Malé	22–24 November 1990	6th SAARC summit	
2	Nepal	Kathmandu, Janakpur, Biratnagar	13–15 February 1991	State visit	

== P. V. Narasimha Rao ==
In his five-year long tenure as the Prime Minister, P. V. Narasimha Rao made 32 international trips, visiting 39 countries, including visits to the United States to attend the United Nations General Assembly.

Prime Minister P. V. Narasimha Rao's visits by country
Number of visits	Country
1 visit (34)	Argentina, Bangladesh, Bhutan, Brazil, Burkina Faso, Colombia, Denmark, Egypt, Ghana, Indonesia, Iran, Japan, Kazakhstan, Kyrgyzstan, Malaysia, Maldives, Mauritius, Nepal, Oman, Portugal, Russia, Senegal, Singapore, South Korea, Spain, Sri Lanka, Tunisia, Turkmenistan, Thailand, United Kingdom, Uzbekistan, Venezuela, Vietnam, Zimbabwe
2 visits (3)	China, Germany, Switzerland
3 visits (2)	France, United States

== Atal Bihari Vajpayee ==
In his six-year long tenure as the Prime Minister, Atal Bihari Vajpayee made 29 international trips, visiting 32 countries, including visits to the United States to attend the United Nations General Assembly.

Prime Minister Atal Bihari Vajpayee's visits by country
Number of visits	Country
1 visit (20)	Bangladesh, China, Iran, Italy, Jamaica, Japan, Laos, Morocco, Namibia, Nepal, Nigeria, Oman, Portugal, Syria, Tajikistan, Thailand, Trinidad and Tobago, United Kingdom, Vatican City, Vietnam
2 visits (10)	Cambodia, France, Germany, Indonesia, Malaysia, Mauritius, Pakistan, South Africa, Sri Lanka, Turkey
3 visits (1)	Russia
5 visits (1)	United States

== H. D. Deve Gowda ==
In his tenure as the Prime Minister, H. D. Deve Gowda made 6 international trips, visiting 6 countries.

Prime Minister H. D. Deve Gowda's visits by country
Number of visits	Country
1 visit (6)	Bangladesh, Italy, Mauritius, Russia, Switzerland, Zimbabwe

	Country	Areas visited	Date(s)	Purpose	Notes
1	Zimbabwe	Harare	3–5 November 1996	6th G-15 summit	
2	Italy	Rome	15–17 November 1996	World Food Summit	
3	Bangladesh	Dhaka	6–7 January 1997		
4	Mauritius	Port Louis	February 1997		
5	Switzerland	Davos	February 1997	World Economic Forum	
6	Russia	Moscow	24–26 March 1997		

== Inder Kumar Gujral ==
In his tenure as the Prime Minister, Inder Kumar Gujral made 4 international trips, visiting 6 countries.

Prime Minister Inder Kumar Gujral's visits by country
Number of visits	Country
1 visit (6)	Bangladesh, Egypt, Maldives, South Africa, Uganda, United States

	Country	Areas visited	Date(s)	Purpose	Notes
1	Maldives	Malé	12–14 May 1997	SAARC summit	
2	United NationsUnited States	New York City	22 September 1997	Met with US President Bill Clinton at the United Nations General Assembly in New York City	
3	Egypt	Cairo	24–25 October 1997		
3	Uganda	Kampala	26–27 October 1997		
3	South Africa	Johannesburg, Durban	28–31 October 1997		
4	Bangladesh	Dhaka	14–15 January 1998		

== Manmohan Singh ==
In his ten-year-long tenure as the prime minister, Manmohan Singh made 71 international trips, visiting 46 countries including the United States to attend the United Nations General Assembly.

Map of international trips made by Manmohan Singh as Prime Minister.

One visit
Two visits
Three visits
Four visits
Five visits
Six or more visits
India

Prime Minister Manmohan Singh's visits by country
Number of visits	Country
1 visit (28)	Belgium, Brunei, Cambodia, Canada, Cuba, Denmark, Egypt, Ethiopia, Finland, Iran, Italy, Kazakhstan, Laos, Maldives, Mauritius, Mexico, Netherlands, Nigeria, Oman, Philippines, Qatar, Saudi Arabia, Sri Lanka, Tanzania, Trinidad and Tobago, Uganda, Uzbekistan, Vietnam
2 visits (7)	Afghanistan, Bangladesh, Bhutan, Malaysia, Myanmar, Singapore, South Korea
3 visits (3)	Brazil, Indonesia, Thailand
4 visits (5)	China, France, Germany, South Africa, United Kingdom
5 visits (1)	Japan
9 visits (1)	Russia
10 visits (1)	United States

== Narendra Modi ==
As of November 2026, Narendra Modi has made 105 international trips, visiting 82 countries, including visits to the United States to attend the United Nations General Assembly.

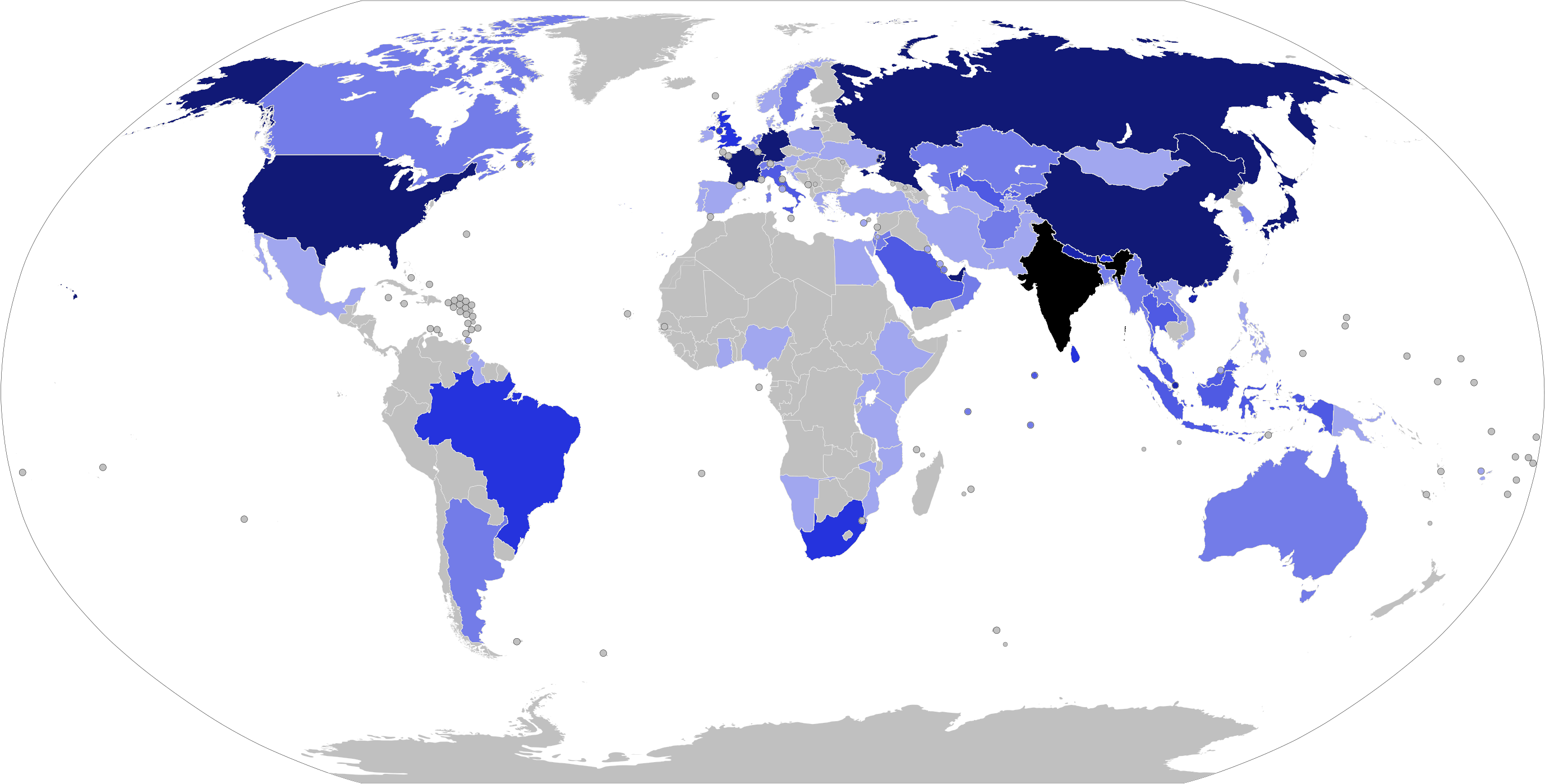
Map of international trips made by Narendra Modi as Prime Minister (as of June 2026).

As of November 2026:

One visit
Two visits
Three visits
Four visits
Five visits
Six or more visits
India

Prime Minister Narendra Modi's visits by country
Number of visits	Country
1 visit (41)	Austria, Bahrain, Belgium, Brunei, Croatia, Cyprus, Denmark, Egypt, Ethiopia, Fiji, Ghana, Greece, Guyana, Iran, Ireland, Kenya, Kuwait, Mexico, Mongolia, Mozambique, Namibia, New Zealand, Nigeria, Norway, Pakistan, Palestine, Papua New Guinea, Poland, Portugal, Rwanda, Slovakia, Spain, Tajikistan, Tanzania, Trinidad and Tobago, Turkey, Turkmenistan, Uganda, Ukraine, Vatican City, Vietnam
2 visits (18)	Afghanistan, Argentina, Bangladesh, Canada, Israel, Jordan, Kazakhstan, Laos, Mauritius, Netherlands, Myanmar, Oman, Philippines, Qatar, Seychelles, South Korea, Sweden, Switzerland
3 visits (7)	Australia, Italy, Kyrgyzstan, Malaysia, Maldives, Saudi Arabia, Thailand
4 visits (7)	Bhutan, Brazil, Indonesia, South Africa, Sri Lanka, United Kingdom, Uzbekistan
5 visits (2)	Nepal, Singapore
6 visits (2)	China, Germany
7 visits (1)	Russia
8 visits (3)	France, Japan, United Arab Emirates
10 visits (1)	United States

== See also ==
- List of international trips made by prime ministers of the United Kingdom
- List of international trips made by presidents of the United States
