= Premiership of Lal Bahadur Shastri =

Government of India from 1964 to 1966

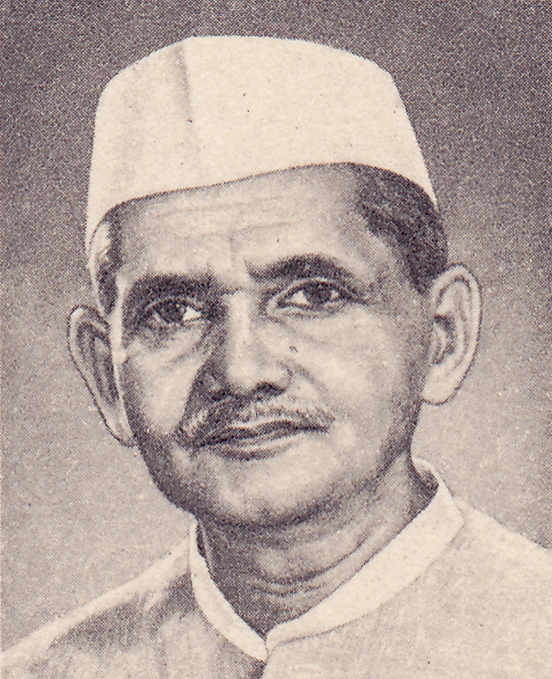
- Shastri's depiction on a stamp (c. 1966)
- Premiership of Lal Bahadur Shastri; 9 June 1964 – 11 January 1966
- Prime Minister: Lal Bahadur Shastri
- Cabinet: Shastri ministry
- Party: Indian National Congress
- Appointed by: President Sarvepalli Radhakrishnan
- Seat: Allahabad
- State Emblem of India

The premiership of Lal Bahadur Shastri extended from 9 June 1964 to 11 January 1966. Previously the Minister of External Affairs, Shastri became the Indian Prime Minister after the death of Jawaharlal Nehru, India's first prime minister, on 27 May 1964. Shastri's tenure as prime minister lasted only nineteen months due to his sudden death in Tashkent, Soviet Union.

== Taking office ==
After the death of Nehru, several leaders of the ruling Indian National Congress nominated Shastri due to his socialist background, to stand against the conservative Morarji Desai. With the backing of Congress President Kumaraswami Kamaraj, Shastri became the party's choice for Prime Minister. Shastri was sworn in on 9 June 1964 taking over from the acting prime minister Gulzarilal Nanda. Commanding a strong majority in the Indian Parliament that it had won in the 1962 Indian general election Shastri and the Congress party did not call fresh elections. In his first broadcast as prime minister, Shastri said:

There comes a time in the life of every nation when it stands at the cross-roads of history and must choose which way to go. But for us there need be no difficulty or hesitation, no looking to right or left. Our way is straight and clear – the building up of a socialist democracy at home with freedom and prosperity for all, and the maintenance of world peace and friendship with all nations.

== Council of Ministers ==
Shastri retained many members of Nehru's Council of Ministers. T. T. Krishnamachari was retained as the Finance Minister of India, as was Defence Minister Yashwantrao Chavan. He appointed Swaran Singh to succeed him as External Affairs Minister. He also appointed Indira Gandhi, daughter of Jawaharlal Nehru and former Congress President, as the Minister of Information and Broadcasting. Gulzarilal Nanda continued as the Minister of Home Affairs.

In a President's Daily Brief submitted by the U.S. Intelligence Community to the then President Lyndon B. Johnson on 10 June 1964, it was quoted that

The Cabinet Shastri has put together clearly reflects his tendency to keep to the middle of the political road. Both the extreme right and left has been frozen out.

== Domestic affairs ==
Shastri continued Nehru's socialist economic policies with central planning. He promoted the White revolution (India) – a national campaign to increase the production and supply of milk – by supporting the Amul milk co-operative of Anand, Gujarat and creating the National Dairy Development Board. While speaking on the chronic food shortages across the country, Shastri urged people to voluntarily give up one meal so that the saved food could be distributed to the affected populace.

== Security and foreign affairs ==
Shastri also continued Nehru's policy of non-alignment but also built closer relations with the Soviet Union. In the aftermath of the disastrous Sino-Indian War of 1962 and the formation of military ties between the Chinese People's Republic and Pakistan, Shastri's government considerably expanded the defence budget and strengthened India's armed forces.

=== War with Pakistan ===
Laying claim to half the Kutch peninsula, the Pakistani army skirmished with Indian forces in August, 1965. In his report to the Lok Sabha on the confrontation in Kutch, Shastri stated:

In the utilization of our limited resources, we have always given primacy to plans and projects for economic development. It would, therefore, be obvious for anyone who is prepared to look at things objectively that India can have no possible interest in provoking border incidents or in building up an atmosphere of strife... In these circumstances, the duty of Government is quite clear and this duty will be discharged fully and effectively... We would prefer to live in poverty for as long as necessary but we shall not allow our freedom to be subverted.

Shastri accepted British mediation, but received much criticism at home for agreeing to the British prime minister's scheme to grant Pakistan 10%, instead of the original claim of 50% of the territory. But when Pakistani forces began incursions into the Indian state of Jammu and Kashmir, Shastri ordered Indian forces to cross the international boundary to repel Pakistani forces. Massive tank battles occurred in the Punjab, and while Pakistani forces made some gains, Indian forces captured the key post at Haji Pir, in Kashmir, and brought the Pakistani city of Lahore under artillery and mortar fire.

=== Tashkent Declaration ===
Shastri and Pakistan's Ayub Khan agreed to a cease-fire mandated by the United Nations. Shastri won great popularity for taking a firm stand against Pakistani aggression. In a broadcast to the nation on the day of the ceasefire, Shastri stated:

While the conflict between the armed forces of the two countries has come to an end, the more important thing for the United Nations and all those who stand for peace is to bring to an end the deeper conflict... How can this be brought about? In our view, the only answer lies in peaceful coexistence. India has stood for the principle of coexistence and championed it all over the world. Peaceful coexistence is possible among nations no matter how deep the differences between them, how far apart they are in their political and economic systems, no matter how intense the issues that divide them.

Shastri accepted mediation from the Soviet Union and signed the Tashkent Declaration on 10 January 1966 with Pakistani president Ayub Khan in the presence of Alexei Kosygin, the Premier of the Soviet Union. Both nations agreed to withdraw their forces to pre-war lines, normalise diplomatic relations and use dialogue to resolve disputes.

== Death and succession ==
Prime Minister Shastri died in Tashkent the day after signing the Tashkent Declaration. He was eulogised as a national hero and the Vijay Ghat memorial established in his memory. Upon his death, Gulzarilal Nanda once again assumed the role of acting prime minister until the Congress Parliamentary Party elected Indira Gandhi over Morarji Desai to succeed Shastri.

== See also ==
- List of international prime ministerial trips made by Lal Bahadur Shastri
