= Bisht =

Bisht may refer to:

- Bisht (surname), North Indian and Nepali surname
- Bisht (clothing), a traditional Arab men's cloak

== See also ==
- Bist (disambiguation)
