= 1967 October Revolution Parade =

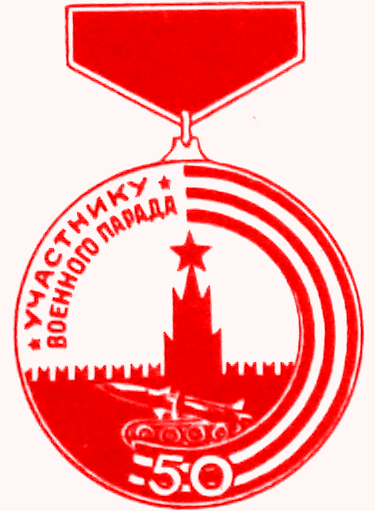
The golden jubilee parade badge.

The 1967 October Revolution Parade was the parade on Moscow's Red Square devoted to the 50th anniversary of the Great October Socialist Revolution on 7 November 1967. Commanding the parade was First Deputy Commander of the Moscow Military District, Colonel General Yevgeny Ivanovsky.

== Parade events ==
As 1967 being the golden jubilee anniversary parade it would feature troops dressed up as historical units from the Russian civil war era. It would also feature the first color guard on parade from the honor guard. Cavalry units from the Revolution era also rode through Red Square.

Notable guests on Lenin's Mausoleum included the following:

- (Soviet Union) General Secretary of the CPSU Leonid Brezhnev
- Minister of Defense, Marshal of the Soviet Union Andrei Grechko (giving his first jubilee address)
- (Soviet Union) Chairman of the Presidium of the Supreme Soviet Nikolai Podgorny
- General Secretary of East Germany's Socialist Unity Party Walter Ulbricht
- (Socialist Federal Republic of Yugoslavia) President of Yugoslavia Josip Broz Tito
- (Mongolian People's Republic) General Secretary of the Mongolian People's Party Yumjaagiin Tsedenbal
- Prime Minister of India Indira Gandhi

The massed bands (under the direction of Major General Nikolai Nazarov) marched off to the tune of "My Beloved Motherland" at the end of the mobile column. Nationwide, the events were aired live on monochrome on Soviet Central Television. Moscow TV viewers saw the first color broadcasts during that parade for the first time on Programme 1 and Moscow Programme 3.

== Full order of the golden jubilee parade ==
The parade displayed the latest Soviet weaponry, with a news report describing it as "a new muscle in every major category... ranging from a massive three-stage intercontinental missile to a relatively tiny anti-tank missile on a reconnaissance car."

=== Ground Column ===
Following the limousine carrying the parade commander, the parade marched past in the following sequence:

- Historical Units and Colors
  - Colour Guard wearing armed workers' uniforms of the Revolution and Civil War
  - Red Guards
  - Former Imperial Russian Army personnel with the Red Army
  - Naval contingent
  - Red Army personnel of 1922
  - Historical Cavalry Units
  - Tachanka
  - Historical horse artillery
  - Historical Armored Units
- Corps of Drums of the Moscow Military Music College
- Frunze Military Academy
- V.I. Lenin Military Political Academy
- Felix Dzerzhinsky Artillery Academy
- Malinovsky Military Armored Forces Academy
- Military Engineering Academy
- Military Academy of Chemical Defense and Control
- Yuri Gagarin Air Force Academy
- Prof. Nikolai Zhukovsky Air Force Engineering Academy
- Naval Engineering School
- 98th Guards Airborne Division
- Moscow Border Guards Superior College
- 336th Guards Marine Brigade
- Suvorov Military School
- Nakhimov Naval School
- Moscow Military High Command Training School "Supreme Soviet of the Russian SFSR"
- Massed Bands of the Moscow Military District (parade finale)

=== Mobile column ===
- 2nd Guards Tamanskaya Motorized Rifle Division
  - BRDM-1
  - BTR-60
  - BMP-1
  - BTR-50
- 98th Guards Airborne Division
  - GAZ-69
  - 85 mm divisional gun D-44 (towed)
  - ASU-85
- 4th Guards Kantermirovsky Tank Division
  - T-62
  - ZSU-57-2
- Rocket Forces and Artillery
  - Air Defense Missile Artillery of the Soviet Army
    - 2K11 Krug
    - 2K12 Kub
  - Towed artillery
    - T-12 antitank gun
    - 100 mm field gun M1944 (BS-3)
    - 122 mm howitzer 2A18 (D-30)
    - 152 mm towed gun-howitzer M1955 (D-20)
  - BM-21 Grad
- Air Defense missile artillery of the Soviet Air Defense Forces
  - S-25 Berkut
  - S-75 Dvina
  - S-200 Angara
  - S-125 Neva/Pechora
  - ABM-1 Galosh
- Tactical and strategic missiles of the Army Rocket Forces and Artillery, Strategic Missile Forces and the Navy's Coastal Defense, Surface and Submarine Forces (Baltic and Northern Fleets)
  - UR-100
  - 2K6 Luna FROG-3
  - 9K52 Luna-M FROG-7
  - Scud-A R-11 Zemlya
  - Scud-B R-17 Elbrus
  - R-9 Desna
  - TR-1 Temp
  - RT-20P
  - R-12 Dvina
  - R-14 Chusovaya
  - R-16
  - R-5 Pobeda
  - P-15 Termit
  - P-5 Pyatyorka
  - R-21

== Commemorative badges ==
In mid-later November 1967, Marshal Andrei Grechkov announced his gratitude on behalf of the Ministry of Defence to all those who marched on Red Square, ordering for the first time that, together with the text of gratitude, participants were presented with commemorative badges that read "Participant of the military parade".

The badge is a gilded circle, in the center of which is the image of the Kremlin's Spasskaya Tower, covered with bright red enamel. On the right, the circle is surrounded by a strip in the form of a Ribbon of Saint George, and on the left, on a white strip in two lines. The number "50" is engraved in the lower part of the badge. The diameter of the badge is 30 mm.

== Celebrations of the golden jubilee ==
After the parade in Moscow the demonstration march of the workers of various sectors of the Soviet Union took place, preceded by an historic fireworks display at the beginning – one that had never been performed before – to mark the golden jubilee anniversary of the Revolution. The daytime fireworks display was a once in a lifetime moment and one of the big highlights of that year's Red Square parade. There were parades in cities such as Yerevan, Baku, Tselinograd (modern day Astana), Priozersk, and Kuybyshev (modern day Samara). During the parade on Lenin Square in Baku, the parade was opened by a guard of honor (from the Baku Higher Combined Arms Command School) instead of drummers, one of the first cities to do that in their annual parade.
