= Shastri Nagar, Ahmedabad =

Shastrinagar
- Neighbourhood
- Location in Ahmedabad, Gujarat, India Shastrinagar (Gujarat)
- Coordinates: 23.010702°N 72.637283°E
- Country: India
- State: Gujarat
- District: Ahmedabad

Government
  - Body: Ahmedabad Municipal Corporation

Languages
  - Official: Gujarati, Hindi
- Time zone: UTC+5:30 (IST)
- PIN: 380013
- Telephone code: 91-079
- Vehicle registration: GJ
- Lok Sabha constituency: Ahmedabad
- Civic agency: Ahmedabad Municipal Corporation
- Website: gujaratindia.com

Shastrinagar is an area located in Ahmedabad, India. In 2002, it was cited as a "planned residential area".
