= Postgraduate Institute of Science =

The Postgraduate Institute of Science (PGIS) is a graduate school of the University of Peradeniya in Sri Lanka. It was established in 1996. The institution functions as a semi-autonomous unit within the University of Peradeniya. The PGIS offers several programmes, namely, Postgraduate Diploma, M.Sc., M.Phil. and Ph.D.
