= Tashkent Declaration =

Peace agreement ending the Indo-Pakistani War of 1965

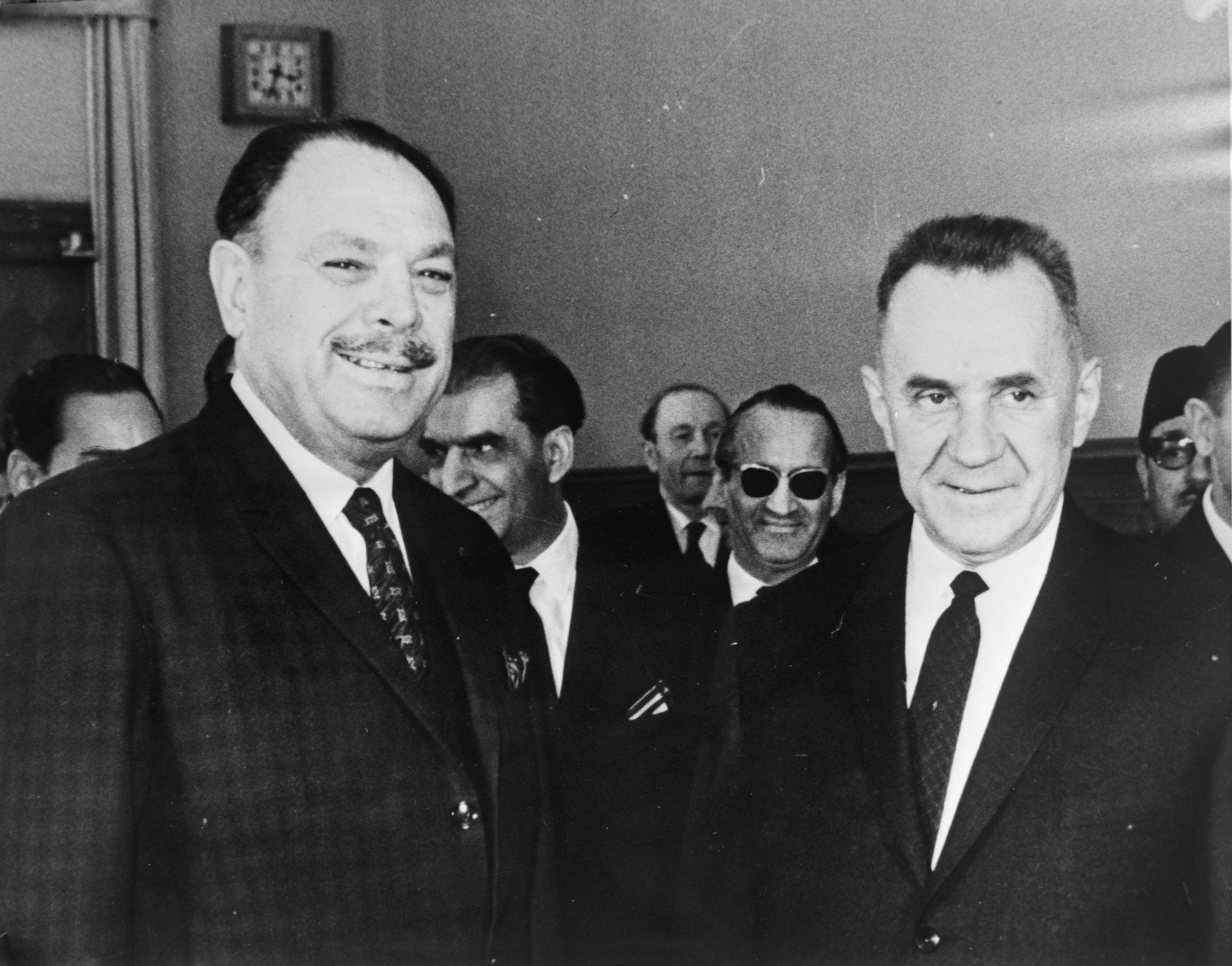
- Muhammad Ayub Khan and Alexei Kosygin at Tashkent during the Tashkent negotiations now in Uzbekistan present time.
- Type: Peace treaty
- Context: Indo-Pakistani War of 1965
- Signed: 10 January 1966; 60 years ago
- Location: Tashkent, Uzbek SSR, Soviet Union
- Mediators: Alexei Kosygin
- Signatories: Lal Bahadur Shastri; Muhammad Ayub Khan
- Parties: India; Pakistan
- Language: English, Urdu and Hindi

The Tashkent Declaration was signed between India and Pakistan on 10 January 1966 to resolve the Indo-Pakistani War of 1965. Peace was achieved on 23 September through interventions by the Soviet Union and the United States, both of which pushed the two warring countries towards a ceasefire in an attempt to avoid any escalation that could draw in other powers.

== Background ==
The meeting was hosted by the Soviet Union in the city of Tashkent, Uzbekistan, from 4 to 10 January 1966 in an attempt to create a more permanent settlement between the warring sides.

The Soviets, represented by Soviet politician Aleksei Kosygin, moderated between Indian prime minister Lal Bahadur Shastri and Pakistani president Muhammad Ayub Khan.

== Declaration ==
A declaration was released that was hoped to be a framework for lasting peace by stating that the Indian military and the Pakistani military would pull back to their pre-conflict positions, their pre-August lines, no later than 25 February 1966; neither nation would interfere in each other's internal affairs; economic and diplomatic relations would be restored; there would be an orderly transfer of prisoners of war, and both leaders would work towards improving bilateral relations.

== Aftermath ==
The treaty was heavily criticized in both countries, as Indians and Pakistanis were expecting more concessions to their respective sides than what had been agreed upon. In accordance with the Tashkent Declaration, talks were held at the ministerial level on 1 and 2 March 1966. Despite the fact that these talks were unproductive, the diplomatic exchange continued throughout the spring and summer, though stark differences of opinion on the Kashmir conflict culminated in the lack of a resolution from bilateral discussions.

In India, the agreement was criticized because it did not contain a no-war pact or any renunciation of guerrilla warfare across Kashmir. After the Tashkent Declaration was signed, Indian prime minister Lal Bahadur Shastri died under mysterious circumstances in Tashkent; his sudden death led to the rise of conspiracy theories claiming that he was poisoned. Journalist, conspiracy theorist, and Holocaust denier Gregory Douglas claimed he conducted a series of interviews with American intelligence officer Robert Crowley in 1993. According to Douglas, Crowley claimed that the Central Intelligence Agency assassinated Shastri as well as Indian nuclear scientist Homi J. Bhabha (who died on Air India Flight 101) in order to thwart the development of India's nuclear weapons programme. The Indian government has refused to declassify a report on his death under the claim that it would harm India's foreign relations, cause disruption in the country, and breach parliamentary privileges.

In Pakistan, the agreement caused widespread distress; social upset was exacerbated after Pakistani president Muhammad Ayub Khan went into seclusion in the ceasefire's aftermath, as demonstrations and riots erupted across the country. However, Khan later addressed the nation on 14 January 1966 and explained the rationale behind the agreement. Although he was eventually able to quell the unrest, the Tashkent Declaration greatly damaged Khan's image, and was one of the factors that ultimately led to his downfall in 1969.

== See also ==
- India–Pakistan conflict
  - Karachi Agreement (1949)
  - Shimla Agreement (1972)
