= Lal Bahadur Shastri Integrated Institute of Science and Technology =

Institute in Kerala, India

Coordinates: 22.624123°N 75.795579°E

Lal Bahadur Shastri Integrated Institute of Science and Technology Malappuram
- Type: Science & Technology Schools
- Established: Approved in 2013
- Affiliations: AICTE
- Location: Malappuram

Lal Bahadur Shastri Integrated Institute of Science and Technology (LBSIIST) Malappuram is located at Pariyapuram in Parappanangadi Municipality of Malappuram. The then Union Human Resource Development Minister Mr.Kapil Sibal agreed to consider granting Rs.50 crore to this, in Nov 2011. The proposal for the institute was in line with the Rajender Sachar Committee Report highlighting the need for new development strategies for educationally backward districts of the country. One entity of the Project- The Model Degree College, Started functioning in the year 2016 with three degree courses, B.Sc. Computer Science, B.com Computer Application, BCA Affiliated to University of Calicut. Presently the Model Degree College, functioning in a rented building 500 m from Parappanangadi Railway station, at Tanur Road
