= Bansal Institute of Science and Technology =

Engineering and management college in Bhopal, Madhya Pradesh, India

- BIST
- Type: Private
- Established: 2000
- Affiliations: R.G.P.V, B.U
- Chairman: Mr. Anil Bansal
- Director: Dr.Damodar Tiwari
- Faculty: 200+
- Students: 15000+
- Undergraduates: 12000+
- Postgraduates: 3000+
- Location: Bhopal, Madhya Pradesh, India
- Campus: Urban
- Colours: yellow and red
- Website: https://bistbpl.in/

Bansal Institute of Science and Technology, Bhopal is a private engineering and management college located in Bhopal, Madhya Pradesh, India. Established in 2000, the institute operates under the Shriniwas Education Society and is part of the Bansal Group of Institutes. It offers undergraduate and postgraduate programs in engineering, technology, and management disciplines.

== History and overview ==
Bansal Institute of Science and Technology (often abbreviated as BIST) was founded to provide quality technical and professional education to students in central India. Since its inception in 2000, it has expanded its academic offerings to include engineering (Bachelor of Technology and Master of Technology), management (MBA), and computer applications (MCA) programs.

== Campus and administration ==
The institute is located in the Kokta, Anand Nagar area of Bhopal. It functions from an urban campus equipped with academic buildings, laboratories, workshops and library facilities.

== Academics ==
BIST is affiliated with Rajiv Gandhi Proudyogiki Vishwavidyalaya (RGPV) for most technical programs and with Barkatullah University for its MBA program. All courses are approved by the All India Council for Technical Education (AICTE).

The institute offers a range of programs:

Undergraduate engineering degrees (B.Tech) in disciplines such as Computer Science and Engineering, Information Technology, Electronics & Communication Engineering, Electrical & Electronics Engineering, Mechanical Engineering, and Civil Engineering.

Postgraduate degrees, including Master of Technology (M.Tech), Master of Business Administration (MBA), and Master of Computer Applications (MCA).

== Admissions ==
Admission to the B.Tech programs is typically based on performance in national or state-level entrance examinations, such as the Joint Entrance Examination (JEE) Main, followed by counselling through the Madhya Pradesh Directorate of Technical Education. PG admissions may consider relevant qualifying examinations.

== Student life and activities ==
The institute hosts academic seminars, workshops, and technical events. Student clubs and societies support co-curricular engagement, and the placement cell works with industry partners to facilitate campus recruitment.

Timelapse

BGI Timelapse is the flagship annual festival of the Bansal Institutes of Science and Technology, bringing students together for a mix of cultural, technical, and recreational activities. It evolved from the earlier college celebration and is positioned as a larger, more energetic event where students from across BGI campuses take part in performances, competitions, and entertainment.

At Timelapse, you’ll typically see:

Music and dance performances

Art and cultural showcases

Adventure and stunt shows like bike or skateboard events

Live shows by popular artists (for example, national performers have been featured in recent editions) The fest is designed to give students a chance to build memories beyond the classroom and celebrate their college experience together.

It’s an event that blends campus spirit with entertainment and student participation, helping strengthen community and creative engagement.

Bansal Utsav

“Bansal Utsav” refers to another major annual celebration at BIST that focuses more on competitions and campus-wide involvement in technical, sports, and cultural events.

Key features of Bansalotsav include:

Technical contests like coding challenges, quizzes, and tech showcases

Sports events such as gully cricket, volleyball, badminton, and athletics

Cultural showcases including dance, singing, fashion shows, wall painting, and more

It typically runs over several days and gives students a platform to test skills, compete, and express themselves creatively.

This fest acts as a broad platform for student talent across disciplines and creates opportunities for teamwork, leadership, and campus engagement outside regular coursework.
