= SAARC Summit =

Summits of the South Asian Association for Regional Cooperation

- Status: Active
- Genre: Diplomatic conference
- Frequency: Biannual
- Years active: 40
- Inaugurated: 7 December 1985

Summits of the South Asian Association for Regional Cooperation (SAARC) were held from 1985 to 2014. As of 2026, a summit has not been held since the 18th summit in Nepal. The SAARC Charter requires summits approximately every eighteen months.

== Summits of SAARC ==
No	Date	Country	Host	Host leader
1st	7–8 December 1985	Bangladesh	Dhaka	Ataur Rahman Khan
2nd	16–17 November 1986	India	Bengaluru	Rajiv Gandhi
3rd	2–4 November 1987	Nepal	Kathmandu	King Birendra Bir Bikram Shah
4th	29–31 December 1988	Pakistan	Islamabad	Benazir Bhutto
5th	21–23 November 1990	Maldives	Malé	Maumoon Abdul Gayoom
6th	21 December 1991	Sri Lanka	Colombo	Ranasinghe Premadasa
7th	10–11 April 1993	Bangladesh	Dhaka	Khaleda Zia
8th	2–4 May 1995	India	New Delhi	P V Narasimha Rao
9th	12–14 May 1997	Maldives	Malé	Maumoon Abdul Gayoom
10th	29–31 July 1998	Sri Lanka	Colombo	Chandrika Kumaratunga
11th	4–6 January 2002	Nepal	Kathmandu	Sher Bahadur Deuba
12th	2–6 January 2004	Pakistan	Islamabad	Zafarullah Khan Jamali
13th	12–13 November 2005	Bangladesh	Dhaka	Khaleda Zia
14th	3–4 April 2007	India	New Delhi	Manmohan Singh
15th	1–3 August 2008	Sri Lanka	Colombo	Mahinda Rajapaksa
16th	28–29 April 2010	Bhutan	Thimphu	Jigme Thinley
17th	10–11 November 2011	Maldives	Addu	Mohammed Nasheed
18th	26–27 November 2014	Nepal	Kathmandu	Sushil Koirala
19th	15–16 November 2016	Pakistan	Islamabad	Cancelled

== SAARC Summit Meetings ==
=== 1st summit Bangladesh ===
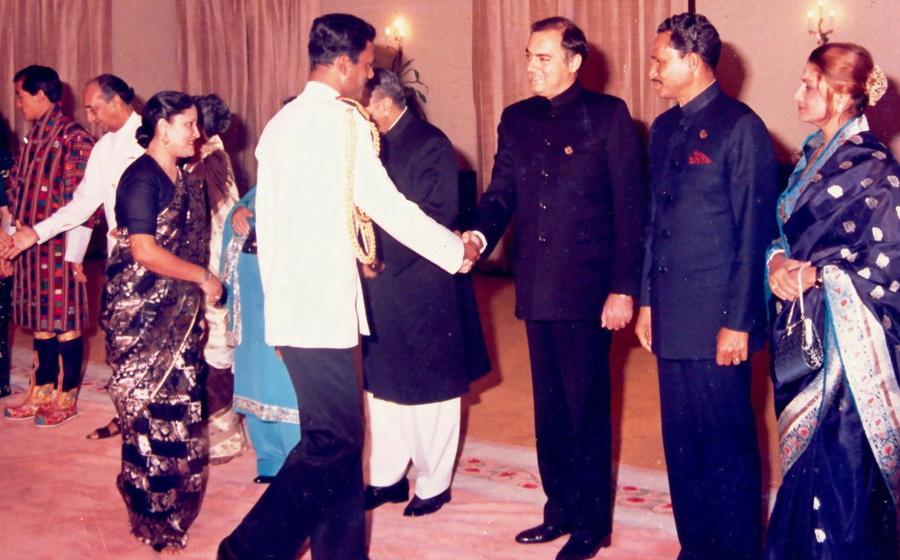
President H. M. Ershad's Reception of SAARC Heads of States in Dhaka.

The first summit was held in Dhaka, Bangladesh on 7–8 December 1985 and was attended by the Government representative and president of Bangladesh, Maldives, Pakistan and Sri Lanka, the kings of Bhutan and Nepal, and the Prime Minister of India. They signed the SAARC Charter on 8 December 1985, establishing the regional association, study groups on the problems of terrorism and drug trafficking. They also planned a meeting about GATT and a conference on increasing the participation of women at the regional level. The summit also agreed to establish a SAARC secretariat and adopted an official SAARC emblem.

=== 2nd summit India ===
The second summit was held on November 17–18 1986 in Bangalore, India. The leaders welcomed the signing of the Memorandum of Understanding on the establishment of the SAARC Secretariat by the Council of Ministers and their decision to locate the Secretariat in Kathmandu and appoint Ambassador Abul Ahsan of Bangladesh as the first Secretary-General of SAARC.

=== 3rd summit Nepal ===
The third summit was held in Kathmandu, Nepal from 2–4 November 1987, and was attended by the Presidents of Bangladesh, the Maldives and Sri Lanka, the Prime Ministers of India and Pakistan, and the kings of Bhutan and Nepal. The foreign ministers of the member states signed the SAARC Regional Convention on Suppression of Terrorism and an agreement to establish a South Asian Food Reserve.

=== 4th summit Pakistan ===
The fourth summit was held in Islamabad, Pakistan on 29–31 December 1988 and was attended by the presidents of Bangladesh, the Maldives and Sri Lanka, the prime ministers of India and Pakistan, and the kings of Bhutan and Nepal. They discussed the coup attempt on 3 November 1988, announced themes for future SAARC summits, and launched a regional plan with socio-economic targets for the end of the century. It was also agreed to hold regular "South Asian Festivals" with the first being hosted by India.

=== 5th summit Maldives ===
The fifth summit was held in Malé, Maldives on 21–23 November 1990 and was attended by the presidents of Bangladesh, the Maldives and Sri Lanka, the prime ministers of India, Nepal and Pakistan, and the king of Bhutan. The leaders launched the Special SAARC Travel Document (for dignitaries, academics, and their families) and signed agreements on narcotics and tourism. They also authorized the SAARC Secretariat to share information and research with the European Community and ASEAN, and expanded on themes for future SAARC summits from 1991-2000, the "SAARC Decade of the Girl Child".

=== 6th summit Sri Lanka ===
The sixth summit was held in Colombo, Sri Lanka on 21 December 1991 and was attended by the prime ministers of Bangladesh, India, Nepal and Pakistan, the presidents of the Maldives and Sri Lanka, and the king of Bhutan.

=== 7th summit Bangladesh ===
The seventh summit was held in Dhaka, on 10–11 April 1993 and attended by the presidents of the Maldives and Sri Lanka, the prime ministers of Bangladesh, India, Nepal and Pakistan, and the king of Bhutan. It was originally scheduled for 1992.

=== 8th summit India ===
The eighth summit was held in New Delhi, on 2–4 May 1995, and was attended by the presidents of the Maldives, Pakistan and Sri Lanka, the prime ministers of Bangladesh, India and Nepal, and the king of Bhutan. It was originally scheduled for 1994.

=== 9th summit Maldives ===
The ninth summit was held in Malé, on 12–14 May 1997, and was attended by the presidents of the Maldives and Sri Lanka, the prime ministers of Bangladesh, India, Nepal and Pakistan, and the king of Bhutan.

=== 10th summit Sri Lanka ===
The tenth summit was held in Colombo, on 29–31 July 1998, and was attended by the presidents of the Maldives and Sri Lanka and the prime ministers of Bangladesh, Bhutan, India, Nepal and Pakistan. SAARC countries stressed the need to eradicate poverty and promote joint collaboration.

=== 11th summit Nepal ===
The eleventh summit was held in Kathmandu, on 4–6 January 2002, and was attended by the presidents of the Maldives, Pakistan and Sri Lanka and the prime ministers of Bangladesh, Bhutan, India and Nepal.

=== 12th summit Pakistan ===
The twelfth summit was held in Islamabad, on 4–6 January 2004, and was attended by the presidents of the Maldives and Sri Lanka and the prime ministers of Bangladesh, Bhutan, India, Nepal and Pakistan. The areas of focus were science and technological cooperation across the region, and the South Asian Free Trade Area (SAFTA).

=== 13th summit Bangladesh ===
The thirteenth summit was held in Dhaka, on 12–13 November 2005, and was attended by the prime ministers of Bangladesh, Bhutan, India and Pakistan, the presidents of the Maldives and Sri Lanka, and the king of Nepal and Bhutan.

=== 14th summit India ===
The fourteenth summit of SAARC was held in New Delhi, India on 3-4 April 2007, and was attended by the presidents of Afghanistan, the Maldives and Sri Lanka, the prime ministers of Bhutan, India, Nepal and Pakistan, and the chief adviser of the government of Bangladesh. The summit stressed the need to improve intra-regional connectivity.

=== 15th summit Sri Lanka ===
The fifteenth summit of SAARC was held in Colombo, Sri Lanka on 1–3 August 2008. The issues discussed included: regional cooperation, the global food crisis, socio-economic development, the environment, culture, combating terrorism, and the admission of Australia and Myanmar as observers.

=== 16th summit Bhutan ===
The sixteenth summit was held in Thimphu, Bhutan on 28–29 April 2010. The central issue was climate change, with the summit titled "Towards a Green and Happy South Asia". The leaders signed a SAARC Convention on Cooperation on Environment and pledged to plant 10 million trees over the next 5 years. India offered support to member countries for developing sustainable energy technologies, capacity building, and climate adaption.

=== 17th summit Maldives ===
The seventeenth summit was held from 10-11 of November 2011 in Addu City, Maldives. The meeting was held at the Equatorial Convention Centre, Addu City.

The Secretary General of SAARC commented on how the summit theme of "Building Bridges" could galvanise action on: economic and income inequality; gender inequality; and the gap between intent and implementation.

In addition, the Addu Declaration of the Seventeenth SAARC summit was adopted.

=== 18th summit Nepal ===
The 18th SAARC summit was held at the Nepalese capital Kathmandu from November 26 to November 27, 2014 and was attended by the prime ministers of Bangladesh, Bhutan, India, Nepal and Pakistan, and the presidents of the Afghanistan, Maldives and Sri Lanka. The motto was ‘Deeper Integration for Peace and Prosperity’. The SAARC Satellite Scheme was authorised at this summit. The scheme will be developed in all member nations except Bangladesh and Pakistan.

=== 19th summit Pakistan ===
Pakistan was scheduled to host the 19th summit of South Asian Association for Regional Cooperation (SAARC) in Islamabad on 15 to 16 November 2016.

Following the 2016 Uri terror attack, India cancelled its participation in the 19th SAARC summit, alleging Pakistan's involvement in the terror attack.

Pakistani Prime Minister Nawaz Sharif in his address to the 19th SAARC summit being held in the Pakistan’s capital, said that the objective of this summit was to address the security issues between India and Pakistan. Hours after Indian PM Narendra Modi decided to boycott the SAARC summit in Islamabad in the wake of Uri terror attack. Bangladesh, Afghanistan, Bhutan, Maldives and Sri Lanka also pulled out of the summit.
