= History of Indian foreign relations =

The history of Indian foreign policy refers to the foreign relations of modern India post-independence, that is the Dominion of India (from 1947 to 1950) and the Republic of India (from 1950 onwards).

== Nehru's foreign-policy: 1947–1966 ==
Jawaharlal Nehru, as prime minister 1947-1964, usually with the assistance of Krishna Menon, shaped the new nation's foreign policy. Nehru served concurrently as Minister of External Affairs; he made all major foreign policy decisions himself after consulting with his advisers and then entrusted the conduct of international affairs to senior members of the Indian Foreign Service. He dealt with five major issues:

- Partition of India and Relations with Pakistan: One of the major foreign policy issues that India faced after its independence in 1947 was the violent partition of the subcontinent and the emergence of Pakistan as a separate state. India and Pakistan had tense relations due to border disputes, which led to several wars between the two countries, including the first war in 1947-1948 and the second in 1965.
- Relations with China: Another major foreign policy challenge for India during this period was its relationship with China, a neighbor to the north. India recognized the People's Republic of China in 1950 and established diplomatic relations with it, but border disputes led to the Sino-Indian War of 1962.
- Non-alignment: India also pursued a policy of non-alignment during the Cold War. Nehru played a leading role in the Non-Aligned Movement, which consisted of developing countries that were not aligned with either the Western (pro-American) or Eastern (pro-Russian) blocs. Nehru never gave up his grandiose dream of forging some sort of international coalition of non-colonial and the colonized powers. However the world was rapidly bifurcated by the emergence of the Cold War between the West, led by the United States and Britain, and the East, led by the Soviet Union. Nehru decided it was urgent to develop policies regarding the Cold War, as well as relations with Pakistan, Britain, and the Commonwealth. Other plans could wait. Nehru and the Congress looked on the Soviet Union with distrust, reassuring the West that there was not the least chance of India lining up with the Soviet Union in war or peace. Nehru intensely disliked the Cold War—the more India got involved, he believed, the worse for his long-term objectives of economic and national development. He took the lead in the non-aligned movement.
- Kashmir Conflict: The issue of dividing the largely Muslim state of Kashmir was a major foreign policy challenge for Nehru. India and Pakistan both claimed the entire region and fought several wars over how it was divided. The United Nations tried but failed to find a solution. At the United Nations, the Soviets supported Pakistan on Kashmir and there was a move to demand arbitration or a plebiscite, but India steadfastly repudiated the notions. Nehru insisted that Indian troops would not be withdrawn from Kashmir.
- Economic Development: India also faced the challenge of promoting economic development and securing foreign aid and investment to achieve this goal. India sought aid from both Western and Eastern bloc countries, but it was often conditioned on political alignment or other considerations. Nehru wanted India to be self-sufficient.

Nehru kept India's membership in the British Commonwealth, despite the widespread distrust of Britain across his Congress party. Popular grievances included the British UN delegation openly supported Pakistan on the Kashmir issue, Britain providing military advice to Pakistan, and London supporting the Dutch efforts to crush Indonesian nationalism. At that time the Commonwealth was little more than a debating society, but one objective was to use it as a sounding board for Third World interests. Non-membership would leave Pakistan in a stronger position. Another factor was the clear need for American help in terms of aid, loans, and trade. Nehru did not want to be too indebted to the Americans, and in that sense, the British and Commonwealth connection would be something of a counterweight. He did insist that the symbolic importance of the King be strictly limited, so there was no sense whatever of royal sovereignty in India.

Nehru set out to establish a conference of the states bordering the Indian Ocean, from Egypt and Ethiopia to the Philippines, Australia, and New Zealand. It was an ambitious plan and gave Nehru the opportunity to give advice to the recently decolonized governments in the region, especially Burma and Ceylon. It led nowhere.

With favorable publicity in America, Nehru and Menon discussed whether India should "align with the United States 'somewhat' and build up our economic and military strength." He made a major visit to the United States and Canada in October 1949. The Truman administration was quite favorable and indicated it would give Nehru anything he asked for. He proudly refused to beg and thereby forfeited the chance for a gift of a million tons of wheat. The American Secretary of State Dean Acheson recognized Nehru's potential world role but added that he was "one of the most difficult men with whom I have ever had to deal." The American visit was a partial success, in that Nehru gained widespread support for his nation, and he himself gained a much deeper understanding of the American outlook. He also stiffened his negative attitude toward the Soviet Union, and also towards the new communist state of China. Nehru was especially annoyed that Moscow had adopted a negative and destructive approach to South East Asia, apparently trying to destabilize the region. Informally, Nehru made it clear that it would help defend Nepal and South East Asia against any communist aggression.

Nehru dramatically changed course in 1950 because of the Korean War. After first voting in the United States nations against the North Korean invasion of South Korea, India announced the only real solution was to admit Communist China to the United Nations. This position greatly pleased Moscow and Beijing but distressed Washington. In 1951 he refused to participate in the Japanese peace treaty, considering it an American imperialistic venturer to seize control of Japanese policies. The net result was that India gained prestige in the Third World, and set the stage for a close relationship with the Soviet Union. Pakistan, meanwhile, grew much closer to the United States and even seriously considered sending troops to fight alongside the Americans in Korea. This set the stage for an American transition to favor Pakistan strongly over India.

Nehru developed from Buddhist thought the Panchsheel (also known as the Five Principles of Peaceful Coexistence), which would be included in future agreements. Nehru based India's foreign policy on these five principles, as articulated in 1954:

- coexistence
- respect for the territorial and integral sovereignty of others
- nonaggression
- non-interference with the internal affairs of others
- recognition of the equality of others.

He did not mention a fierce determination to retain control of the Kashmir, a goal that would soon emerge.

== Indira Gandhi foreign-policy: 1966–1984 ==
The stated aims of the foreign policy of the Indira Gandhi premiership between 1967 and 1977 include a focus on security, by fighting militants abroad and strengthening border defenses. On 30 October 1981, Gandhi said, "A country's policy is shaped by many forces- its position on the map, and the countries which are its neighbours, the policies they adopt, and the actions they take, as well as its historical experiences in the aggregate and in terms of its particular success or traumas."

In early 1971, disputed elections in Pakistan led East Pakistan to declare independence as Bangladesh. Repression and violence by the Pakistani army led 10 million refugees to cross border in to India over the coming months. Finally in December 1971, Gandhi directly intervened in the conflict to defeat Pakistan's army in Bangladesh. India emerged victorious in the resulting conflict to become the dominant power of South Asia. India had signed a treaty with the Soviet Union promising mutual assistance in the case of war, while Pakistan received active support from the United States during the conflict. U.S. President Richard Nixon disliked Gandhi personally. Relations with the U.S. became distant as Gandhi developed closer ties with the Soviet Union after the war. The latter grew to become India's largest trading partner and its biggest arms supplier.

== Foreign policy since 1989 ==
After collapse of the Soviet Union and the end of the Cold War in 1989, India no longer had to deal with its nonaligned position in the Cold War. Diplomat Shivshankar Menon identified five major policy decisions. They were: the 1993 Border Peace and Tranquility Agreement with China; the Civil Nuclear Agreement with the United States in 2005; the rejection of force against Pakistan after the 2008 Mumbai attacks; dealing with Sri Lanka's civil war; and announcing a policy of No first use of nuclear weapons.

== Pakistan ==
Relations between India and Pakistan have been complex and largely hostile due to a number of historical and political events. Relations between the two states have been defined by the violent partition of British India in 1947 which started the Kashmir conflict, and the numerous military conflicts fought between the two nations. Consequently, their relationship has been plagued by hostility and suspicion. Northern India and Pakistan somewhat overlap in areas of certain demographics and shared lingua francas (mainly Punjabi, Sindhi and Hindustani).

After the dissolution of the British Raj in 1947, two new sovereign nations were formed—the Dominion of India and the Dominion of Pakistan. The subsequent partition of the former British India displaced up to 12.5 million people, with estimates of loss of life varying from several hundred thousand to 1 million. India emerged as a secular nation with a Hindu majority population and a large Muslim minority, while Pakistan with a Muslim majority population and a large Hindu minority later became an Islamic Republic although its constitution guaranteed freedom of religion to people of all faiths. It later lost most of its Hindu minority due to migration and after East Pakistan was separated in the Bangladesh Liberation War.

Soon after their independence, India and Pakistan established diplomatic relations but the violent partition and numerous territorial claims would overshadow their relationship. Since their Independence, the two countries have fought three major wars, one undeclared war and have been involved in numerous armed skirmishes and military standoffs. The Kashmir conflict is the main centre-point of all of these conflicts with the exception of the Indo-Pakistan War of 1971 and Bangladesh Liberation War, which resulted in the secession of East Pakistan (now Bangladesh).

There have been numerous attempts to improve the relationship—notably, the Shimla summit, the Agra summit and the Lahore summit. Since the early 1980s, relations between the two nations soured particularly after the Siachen conflict, the intensification of Kashmir insurgency in 1989, Indian and Pakistani nuclear tests in 1998 and the 1999 Kargil war. Certain confidence-building measures — such as the 2003 ceasefire agreement and the Delhi–Lahore Bus service – were successful in de-escalating tensions. However, these efforts have been impeded by periodic terrorist attacks. The 2001 Indian Parliament attack almost brought the two nations to the brink of a nuclear war. The 2007 Samjhauta Express bombings, which killed 68 civilians (most of whom were Pakistani), was also a crucial point in relations. Additionally, the 2008 Mumbai attacks carried out by Pakistani militants resulted in a severe blow to the ongoing India-Pakistan peace talks.

After a brief thaw following the election of new governments in both nations, bilateral discussions again stalled after the 2016 Pathankot attack. In September 2016, a terrorist attack on an Indian military base in Indian-administered Kashmir, the deadliest such attack in years, killed 19 Indian Army soldiers. India's claim that the attack had been orchestrated by a Pakistan-supported jihadist group was denied by Pakistan, which claimed the attack had been a local reaction to unrest in the region due to excessive force by Indian security personnel. The attack sparked a military confrontation across the Line of Control, with an escalation in ceasefire violations and further militant attacks on Indian security forces. Since 2016, the ongoing confrontation, continued terrorist attacks and an increase in nationalist rhetoric on both sides has resulted in the collapse of bilateral relations, with little expectation they will recover. Notably, following the 2019 Pulwama attack, the Indian government revoked Pakistan's most favoured nation trade status, which it had granted to Pakistan in 1996. India also increased the custom duty to 200% which majorly affected the trade of Pakistani apparel and cement.

Since the election of new governments in both India and Pakistan in the early 2010s, some attempts have been made to improve relations, in particular developing a consensus on the agreement of Non-Discriminatory Market Access on Reciprocal Basis (NDMARB) status for each other, which will liberalize trade. Both India and Pakistan are members of the South Asian Association for Regional Cooperation and its South Asian Free Trade Area. Pakistan used to host a pavilion at the annual India International Trade Fair which drew huge crowds. Deteriorating relations between the two nations resulted in boycott of Pakistani traders at the trade fair.

In November 2015, the new Indian Prime Minister, Narendra Modi and Pakistani Prime Minister Nawaz Sharif agreed to the resumption of bilateral talks; the following month, Prime Minister Modi made a brief, unscheduled visit to Pakistan while en route to India, becoming the first Indian Prime Minister to visit Pakistan since 2004. Despite those efforts, relations between the countries have remained frigid, following repeated acts of cross-border terrorism. According to a 2017 BBC World Service poll, only 5% of Indians view Pakistan's influence positively, with 85% expressing a negative view, while 11% of Pakistanis view India's influence positively, with 62% expressing a negative view.

In August 2019, following the approval of the Jammu and Kashmir Reorganisation Bill in the Indian Parliament, which revoked the special status of Jammu and Kashmir, further tension was brought between the two countries, with Pakistan downgrading their diplomatic ties, closing its airspace and suspending bilateral trade with India.

== Non-aligned movement ==
Nehru was the leader of the Non-Aligned Movement. It was the largest movement outside of the United Nations. After the collapse of the USSR some people are of the view that the movement lost its relevance, but it may be argued that non alignment remains relevant albeit with altered locus and focus.

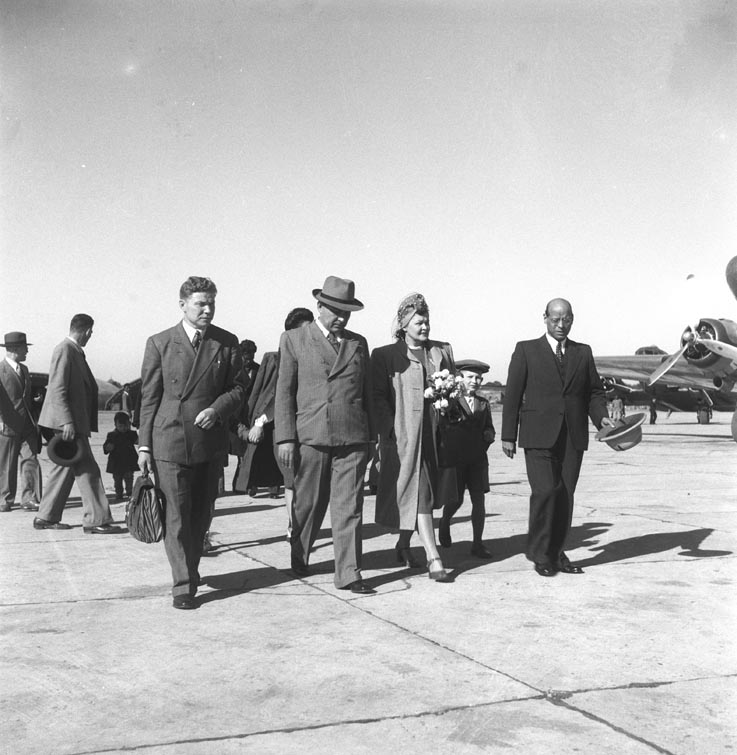
Soviet Ambassador Kirill Novikov arriving in New Delhi 1947 to establish formal diplomatic relations with India

== Russia ==
The long-standing close relationship abruptly ended with the collapse of the Soviet Union in December 1991. The steep decline ended by the mid-1990s with the new partnership organized by the Russian leader Vladimir Putin. In the 21st century, the goals of Russian foreign policy include the expansion of economic cooperation, weapon and technology transfer. For example, Russia provided technical assistance to India's Kudankulam Nuclear Power Project.

== United States ==
The diplomatic relations between India and the United States have evolved over time, with various themes emerging and shaping the trajectory of the relationship. Some of the main themes of historical diplomatic relations between India and the USA are:

- Cold War era: During the Cold War era, India maintained a policy of non-alignment, which led to a tense relationship with the United States. The US saw India as being too close to the Soviet Union, while India was suspicious of American intentions in the region.
- Nuclear issues: In the 1970s, India conducted a nuclear test, which led to US sanctions being imposed on the country. However, in the early 2000s, the US and India signed a landmark civil nuclear agreement, which brought India closer to the international nonproliferation regime.
- Economic ties: Since the 1990s, economic ties between India and the US have grown significantly. The two countries are important trading partners, and there is also significant investment by American companies in India.
- Counterterrorism: In the aftermath of the September 11 attacks on the US, the two nations have cooperated closely on counterterrorism issues. The two countries have signed various agreements on intelligence sharing and joint military exercises.
- Strategic partnership: In recent years, India and the US have sought to deepen their strategic partnership based on cultural, economic and historical ties. This has included increased cooperation on defense and security issues, as well as efforts to strengthen the Indo-Pacific region.

Overall, the relationship between India and the US has been complex, shaped by various geopolitical and economic factors. However, in recent years, there has been a growing recognition of the importance of the relationship, and efforts to build a closer partnership between the two countries.

In July 2025, for first times, US President Donald Trump announced that Indian products would be subject to 25% tariffs upon arrival in the United States starting August 1, and that a "penalty" would be added for the purchase of Russian oil.

== China ==
The cultural and economic relations between China and India date back to ancient times, with the Silk Road playing a significant role in facilitating trade and the spread of Buddhism. During the 19th century, The British used opium from India to build a large market in China. India and China both fought the Japanese during World War II. After India gained independence in 1947, it established relations with the anti-Communist Republic of China. However, in 1950, India recognized the new Communist People's Republic of China as the legitimate government of China. In the 1950s, while China was closely aligned witrh the Soviet Union, India was a leader of the non-alignment movement trying to remain independent of the confrontations of the Cold War. After 1960 China and the USSR battled for control of India's far left movements. The government of India favored the USSR and relied on Moscow for military supplies, while Pakistan worked with China.

China has been India's largest trading partner between 2008 and 2021. However border disputes and economic nationalism have been sources of contention between the two, leading to conflicts and military standoffs along the long border. The Sino-Indian War of 1962, border clashes in 1967, and the 1987 Sumdorong Chu standoff were the most serious episodes. Smaller border tensions continue. Both countries have established military infrastructure along the border areas, and India is concerned about China's relations with Pakistan and its support for separatist groups in Northeast India.

China is concerned about India's military and economic activities in the South China Sea and hosting of anti-China activities by Tibetan exiles. The South Asian region has become a site of intense competition between China and India.

== See also ==
- Foreign relations of India
- Minister of External Affairs (India)
- Non-Aligned Movement
- Reform of the United Nations Security Council
- Rajamandala
