= List of official overseas trips made by Elizabeth II =

- For visits to Commonwealth countries, see List of Commonwealth official trips made by Elizabeth II.
- For visits to non-Commonwealth countries, see List of state visits made by Elizabeth II.
