= List of state visits made by Elizabeth II =

Overseas trips made by Elizabeth II United Kingdom 10 visits or more 9 visits 7 visits 6 visits 5 visits 4 visits 3 visits 2 visits 1 visit

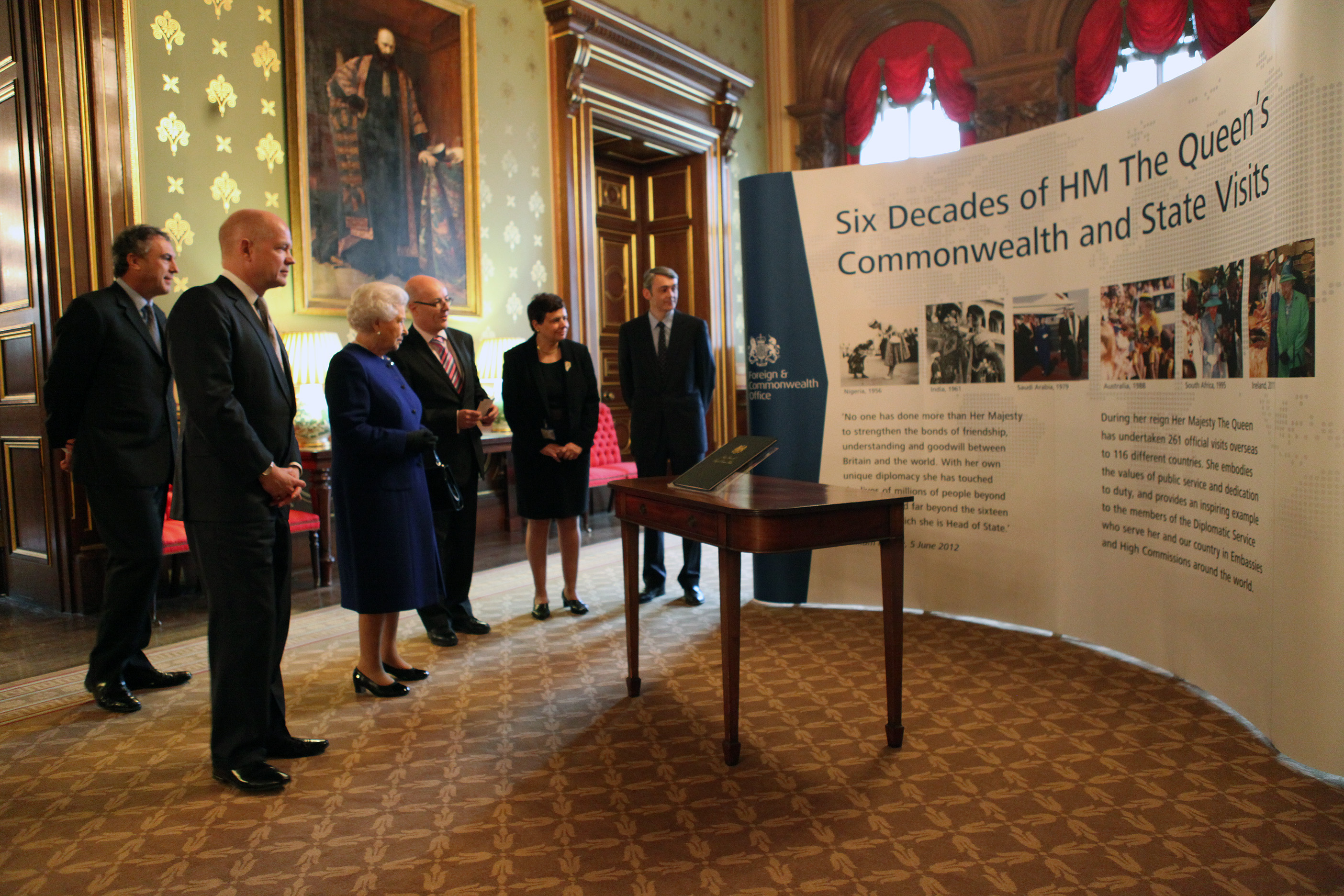
Presentation of a book of the Six Decades of H.M. The Queen's Commonwealth and State Visits, 18 December 2012

Queen Elizabeth II undertook a number of state and official visits over her 70-year reign (1952 to 2022), as well as trips throughout the Commonwealth, making her the most widely travelled head of state in history. She did not require a British passport for travelling overseas, as all British passports were issued in her name.

Elizabeth II was the sovereign of more than one independent state and represented both Canada and the United Kingdom on state visits, though the former on just two occasions. The relevant governor-general usually carried out state visits on the Queen's behalf.

== As Queen of Canada ==
Date	Country	Cities visited	Host
17–20 October 1957	United States (Note: Among the guests who attended the state dinner hosted by the Eisenhowers in the White House on 17 October were Senate Majority Leader Lyndon B. Johnson and his wife Lady Bird, making this the only occasion on which the Queen and LBJ ever met.)	Jamestown, Washington, D.C., New York City	President Eisenhower
27 June and 6 July 1959	United States	Massena, Chicago	Vice President Nixon, Governor Stratton

== As Queen of the United Kingdom ==
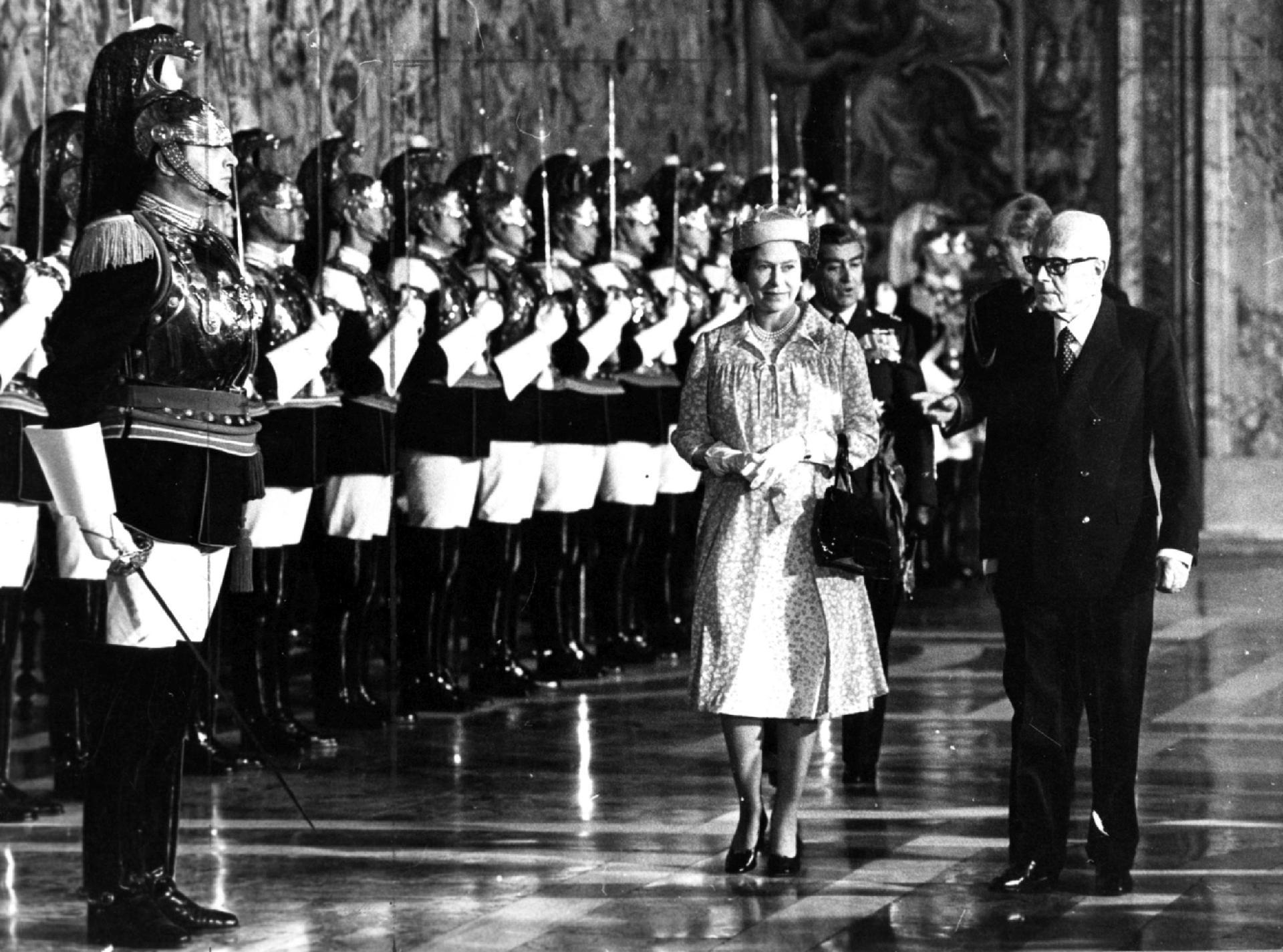
Queen Elizabeth II and Prince Philip, Duke of Edinburgh hosted by President Sandro Pertini at the Quirinal Palace in Rome, Italy, October 1980

Date	Country	Cities visited	Host
29 November 1953	Panama Canal Zone (part of a wider tour, not a state visit)	Colón	Governor John S. Seybold
29–30 November 1953	Panama	Panama City	President Remón
1 May 1954	Kingdom of Libya	Tobruk	King Idris
24–26 June 1955	Norway	Oslo	King Haakon VII
8–10 June 1956	Sweden	Stockholm	King Gustaf VI Adolf
18–21 February 1957	Portugal	Montijo, Setúbal, Lisbon, Queluz, Caldas da Rainha, Nazaré, Alcobaça, Batalha, Vila Franca de Xira	President Lopes
8–11 April 1957	France	Paris, Lille	President Coty
21–23 May 1957	Denmark	Copenhagen	King Frederick IX
17–20 October 1957	United States	New York City, Washington, D.C., Williamsburg	President Eisenhower
25–27 March 1958	Netherlands	Amsterdam, Delft, Rotterdam, The Hague	Queen Juliana
26 February – 2 March 1961	Kingdom of Nepal	Kathmandu, Pokhara	King Mahendra
2–6 March 1961	Iran	Tehran, Isfahan, Shiraz, Persepolis	Shah Mohammad Reza
2–5 May 1961	Italy	Rome, Naples, Venice, Florence, Milan, Cagliari, Turin	President Gronchi
5 May 1961	Vatican City		Pope John XXIII
23 November 1961	Liberia	Monrovia	President Tubman
1–8 February 1965	Ethiopian Empire	Addis Ababa, Asmara, Gondar	Emperor Haile Selassie
8–12 February 1965	Sudan	Khartoum, Al-Ubayyid	President Mahi
18–28 May 1965	West Germany	Bonn, Königswinter, Koblenz, Kaub, Wiesbaden, Munich, Stuttgart, Marbach, Schwäbisch Hall, Cologne, Düsseldorf, Duisburg, Soest, Gütersloh, Hanover, Hamburg	President Lübke
27 May 1965	West Berlin	West Berlin	Mayor Brandt
9–13 May 1966	Belgium	Brussels, Antwerp	King Baudouin
5–11 November 1968	Brazil	Recife, Salvador, Brasília, São Paulo, Rio de Janeiro	President Costa e Silva
11–18 November 1968	Chile	Santiago, Valparaíso, Pucón	President Frei
5–10 May 1969	Austria	Vienna, Salzburg, Innsbruck	President Jonas
18–25 October 1971	Turkey	Ankara, İzmir, Istanbul, Kuşadası, Ephesus, Gallipoli	President Sunay
10–15 February 1972	Thailand	Bangkok	King Bhumibol Adulyadej
13–14 March 1972	Maldives	Malé, Gan	President Nasir
15–19 May 1972	France	Paris	President Pompidou
17–21 October 1972	Yugoslavia	Belgrade, Dubrovnik, Zagreb	President Tito
15–22 March 1974	Indonesia	Bali, Jakarta, Magelang, Yogyakarta	President Suharto
24 February – 1 March 1975	Mexico	Mexico City, Cozumel, Oaxaca, Guanajuato, Mérida, Tizimín, Veracruz	President Echeverría
7–12 May 1975	Japan	Tokyo, Osaka, Kyoto, Ise	Emperor Hirohito
25–28 May 1976	Finland	Helsinki, Turku, Jyväskylä	President Kekkonen
6–11 July 1976	United States	Philadelphia, Washington, New York City, New Haven, Charlottesville, Providence, Boston	President Ford
8–12 November 1976	Luxembourg		Grand Duke Jean
9 February 1977	American Samoa (part of a wider tour; not a state visit)	Pago Pago	Governor Frank E. Barnett
22–26 May 1978	West Germany	Bonn, Mainz, Bremen, Bremerhaven, Kiel	President Scheel
26 May 1978	West Berlin	West Berlin	Mayor Stobbe
12–14 February 1979	Kuwait	Kuwait City	Emir Jaber III
14–17 February 1979	Bahrain		Emir Isa
17–20 February 1979	Saudi Arabia	Riyadh, Dhahran	King Khalid
21–24 February 1979	Qatar		Emir Khalifa
24–27 February 1979	United Arab Emirates	Abu Dhabi, Dubai	Sheikh Zayed
28 February – 2 March 1979	Oman	Muscat, Nizwa	Sultan Qaboos
16 May 1979	Denmark	Copenhagen, Aalborg	Queen Margrethe II
29 April – 2 May 1980	Switzerland	Bern, Basel, Lausanne, Lucerne, Rütli, Montreux, Veytaux (Chillon Castle), Zurich, Geneva (ICRC)	President Chevallaz
14–17 October 1980	Italy	Rome, Genoa, Naples, Pompeii, Palermo	President Pertini
17 October 1980	Vatican City		Pope John Paul II
21–23 October 1980	Tunisia	Tunis, Borj El Amri	President Bourguiba
25–27 October 1980	Algeria	Algiers	President Bendjedid
27–30 October 1980	Morocco	Rabat, Marrakesh, Casablanca	King Hassan II
5–8 May 1981	Norway	Oslo	King Olav V
17–22 February 1983	Mexico	Acapulco, Lázaro Cárdenas, Puerto Vallarta, La Paz	President de la Madrid
26 February – 6 March 1983	United States (not a state visit)	San Diego, Palm Springs, Los Angeles, Sierra Madre, Duarte, Santa Barbara, San Francisco, Sacramento, Stanford, Palo Alto, Yosemite, Seattle	President Reagan
25–28 May 1983	Sweden	Stockholm, Gothenburg	King Carl XVI Gustaf
26–30 March 1984	Jordan	Amman, Petra, Aqaba	King Hussein
25–29 March 1985	Portugal	Lisbon, Évora, Porto	President Eanes
17–21 February 1986	Nepal	Kathmandu	King Birendra
12–18 October 1986	People's Republic of China	Beijing, Shanghai, Xi'an, Kunming, Guangzhou	President Li
26–27 May 1987	West Germany		President von Weizsäcker
17–21 October 1988	Spain	Madrid, Seville, Barcelona, Mallorca	King Juan Carlos I
25–27 June 1990	Iceland	Reykjavík	President Vigdís
23 November 1990	Germany	Bonn, Weeze	President von Weizsäcker
14–26 May 1991	United States	Washington, D.C., Arlington, Baltimore, Tampa, Miami, Austin, San Antonio, Dallas, Houston	President George H. W. Bush
9–12 June 1992	France	Paris, Blois, Bordeaux	President Mitterrand
19–23 October 1992	Germany	Bonn, Berlin, Leipzig, Dresden	President von Weizsäcker
4–7 May 1993	Hungary	Budapest, Kecskemét, Bugac	President Göncz
7 August 1993	Belgium	Brussels (for King Baudouin's funeral)	Albert, the Prince of Liège
6 May 1994	France	Calais	President Mitterrand
17–20 October 1994	Russia	Moscow, Saint Petersburg	President Yeltsin
21 October 1994	Finland (official visit; not state visit)	Helsinki	President Ahtisaari
25–27 March 1996	Poland	Warsaw, Kraków	President Kwaśniewski
27–29 March 1996	Czech Republic	Prague, Brno	President Havel
28 October – 1 November 1996	Thailand	Bangkok, Ayutthaya	King Bhumibol Adulyadej
11 November 1998	Belgium	Ypres	King Albert II
19–22 April 1999	South Korea	Seoul, Andong	President Kim Dae-jung
16–19 October 2000	Italy	Rome, Milan	President Ciampi
17 October 2000	Vatican City		Pope John Paul II
30 May – 1 June 2001	Norway	Oslo	King Harald V
5–7 April 2004	France	Paris, Toulouse	President Chirac
2–4 November 2004	Germany	Berlin, Potsdam, Düsseldorf	President Köhler
16–17 October 2006	Lithuania	Vilnius	President Adamkus
18–19 October 2006	Latvia	Riga	President Vike-Freiberga
19–20 October 2006	Estonia	Tallinn	President Ilves
5 February 2007	Netherlands	The Hague, Amsterdam	Queen Beatrix
3–8 May 2007	United States	Washington, Richmond, Jamestown, Williamsburg, Lexington, Louisville, Greenbelt	President George W. Bush
11–12 July 2007	Belgium	Brussels, Ypres, Laeken, Wavre	King Albert II
13–16 May 2008	Turkey	Ankara, Istanbul, Bursa	President Gül
21–22 October 2008	Slovenia	Ljubljana, Kranj	President Türk
23–24 October 2008	Slovakia	Bratislava, Starý Smokovec, Hrebienok, Poprad	President Gašparovič
6 July 2010	United States (official visit; not state visit)	New York City	Secretary-General Ki-moon
24–25 November 2010	United Arab Emirates	Abu Dhabi	Sheikh Khalifa
25–28 November 2010	Oman	Muscat	Sultan Qaboos
17–20 May 2011	Ireland	Dublin, Kildare, Cashel, Cork	President McAleese
3 April 2014	Italy	Rome	President Napolitano
3 April 2014	Vatican City		Pope Francis
5–7 June 2014	France		President Hollande
23–26 June 2015	Germany	Berlin, Frankfurt, Celle	President Gauck

== See also ==
- List of state visits received by Elizabeth II
- List of Commonwealth official trips made by Elizabeth II
- List of state and official visits by Canada
- List of official overseas trips made by Queen Elizabeth the Queen Mother
- List of official overseas trips made by George VI, her predecessor
- List of official overseas trips made by Charles III, her successor
- List of official overseas trips made by William, Prince of Wales
- List of official overseas trips made by Catherine, Princess of Wales
- List of official overseas trips made by Prince Harry, Duke of Sussex, and Meghan, Duchess of Sussex
