= List of Commonwealth official trips made by Elizabeth II =

Overseas trips made by Elizabeth II United Kingdom 10 trips or more 9 trips 7 trips 6 trips 5 trips 4 trips 3 trips 2 trips 1 trip

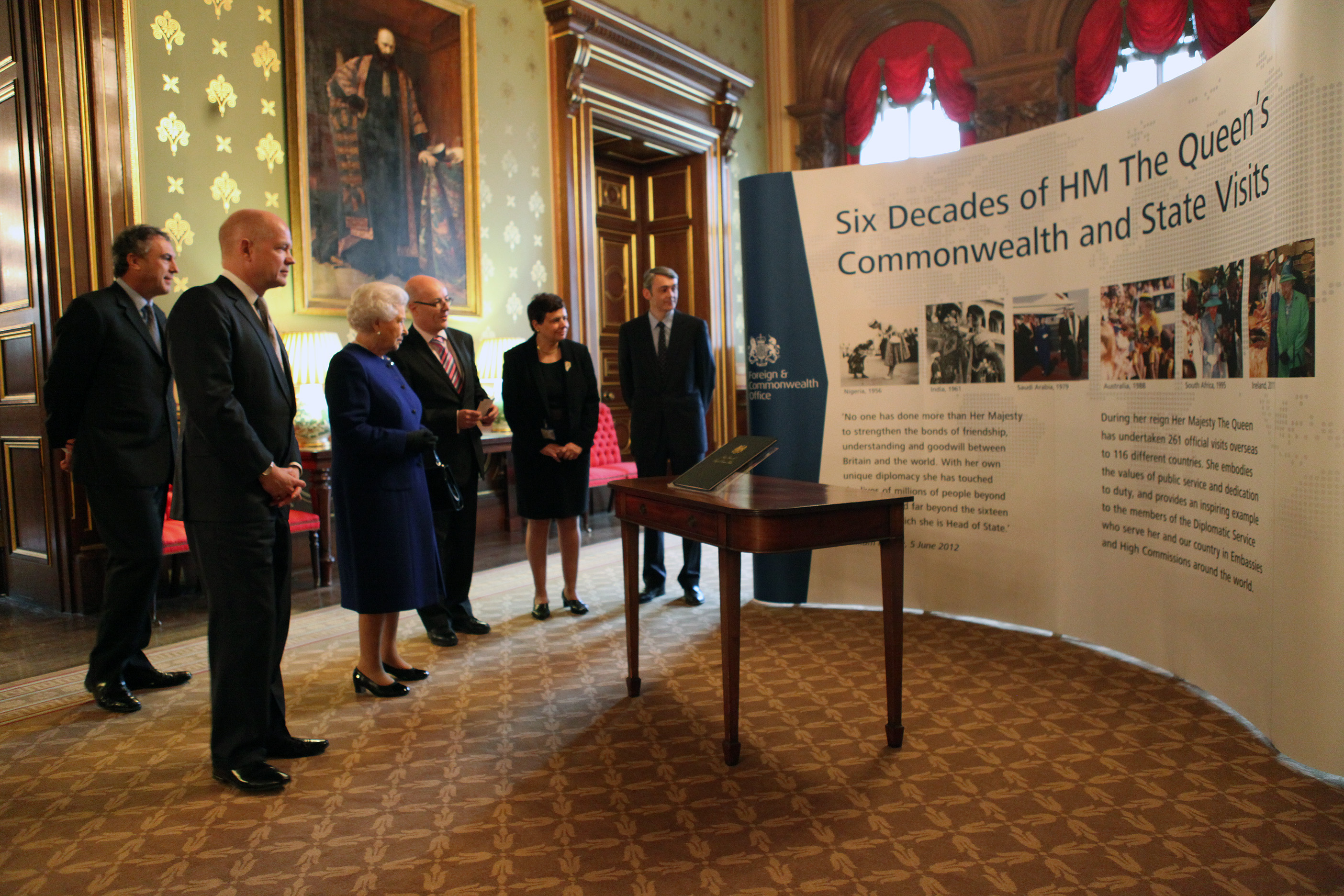
Presentation of a book of the Six Decades of HM The Queen's Commonwealth and State Visits, 18 December 2012

Queen Elizabeth II became Head of the Commonwealth upon the death of her father, King George VI, on 6 February 1952 and remained Head of the Commonwealth until her death on 8 September 2022. During that time, she toured the Commonwealth of Nations widely. She visited all member states except for Cameroon, and the three most recently joined member states, Rwanda, Togo and Gabon. Her first foreign tour was before her accession when she accompanied her parents to the countries of Southern Africa in 1947.

Tours of the British Islands are excluded from the list below.

== 1950s ==
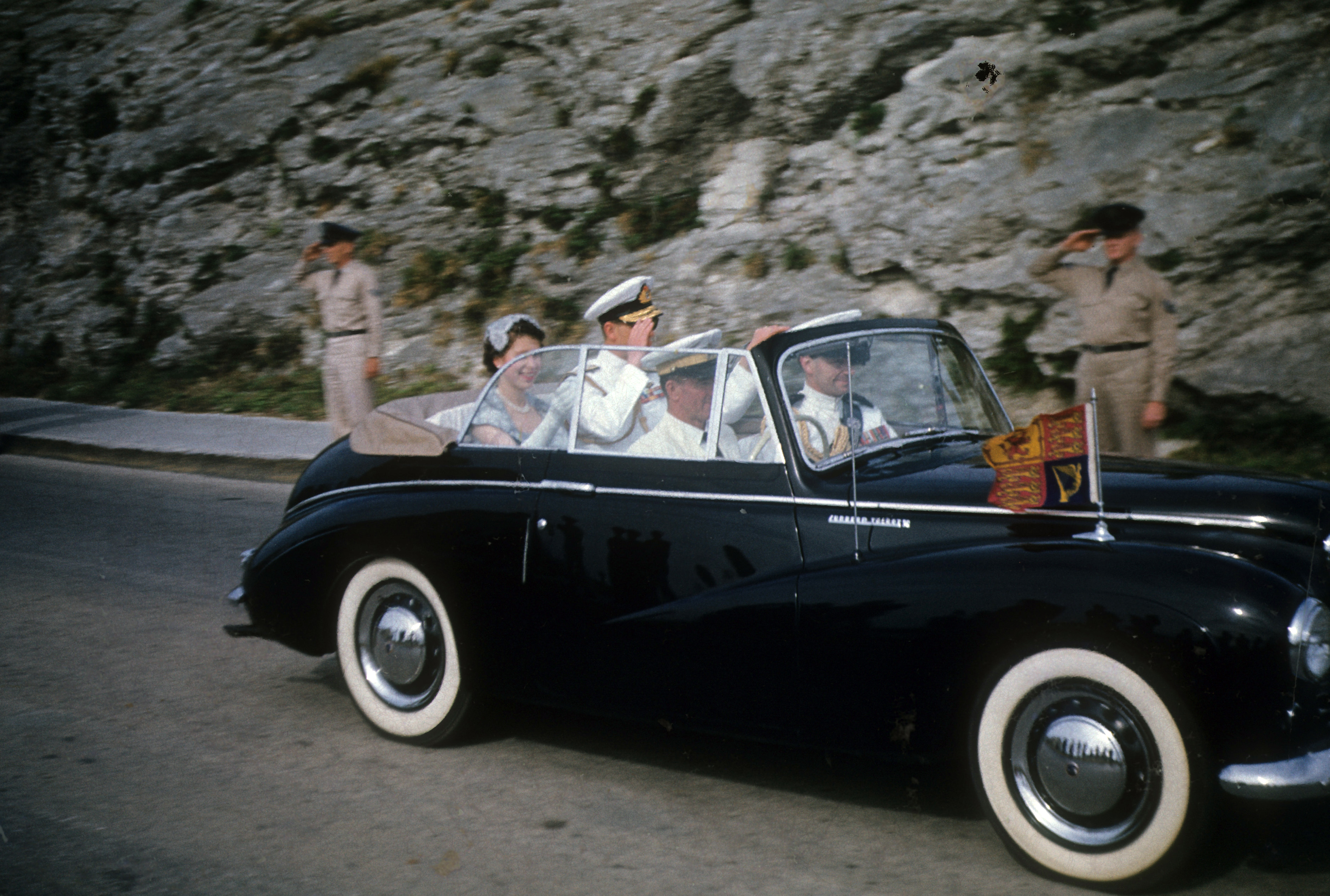
The Queen and the Duke of Edinburgh visiting Bermuda in 1953

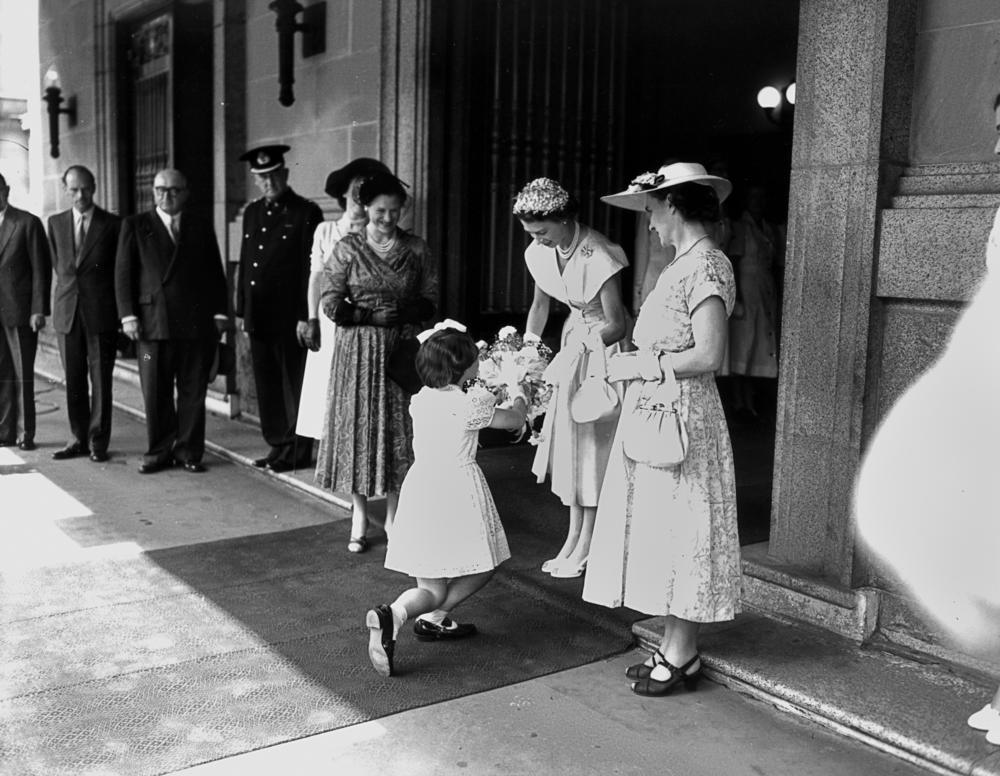
A young girl presenting flowers to The Queen outside Brisbane City Hall, March 1954

Date	Country	Host
6 February 1952	Kenya	Governor Mitchell
24–25 November 1953	Bermuda	Governor Hood
25–27 November 1953	Jamaica	Governor Foot
17–19 December 1953	Fiji	Governor Garvey
19–20 December 1953	Tonga	Queen Sālote Tupou III
23 December 1953 – 30 January 1954	New Zealand	Governor-General Norrie
3 February 1954 – 1 April 1954	Australia	Governor-General Slim
5 April 1954	(Straits Settlements) Cocos Islands	Governor Nicoll
10–21 April 1954	Ceylon	Governor-General Ramsbotham
27 April 1954	Aden	Governor Hickinbotham
28–30 April 1954	Uganda	Governor Cohen
3–7 May 1954	Malta	Governor Creasy
10 May 1954	Gibraltar	Governor MacMillan
28 January – 16 February 1956	Nigeria	Governor-General Robertson
12–16 October 1957	Canada	Governor General Massey
18 June – 1 August 1959	Canada	Governor General Massey

== 1960s ==
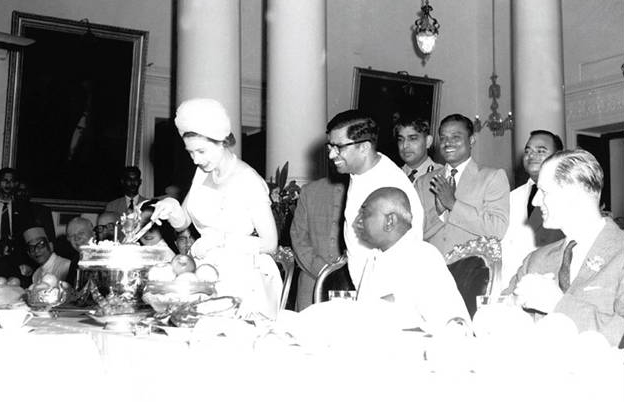
The Queen cutting a cake in celebration of the first birthday of Prince Andrew in Chennai, India, 19 February 1961

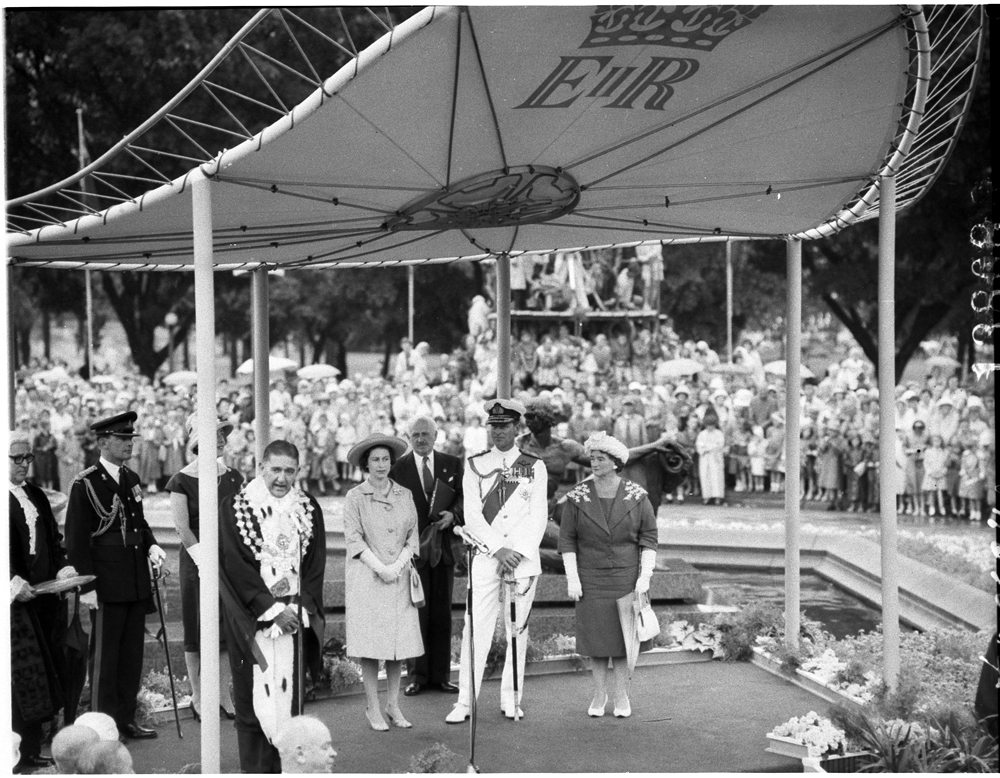
The Queen and the Duke of Edinburgh at Sydney, Australia, February 1963

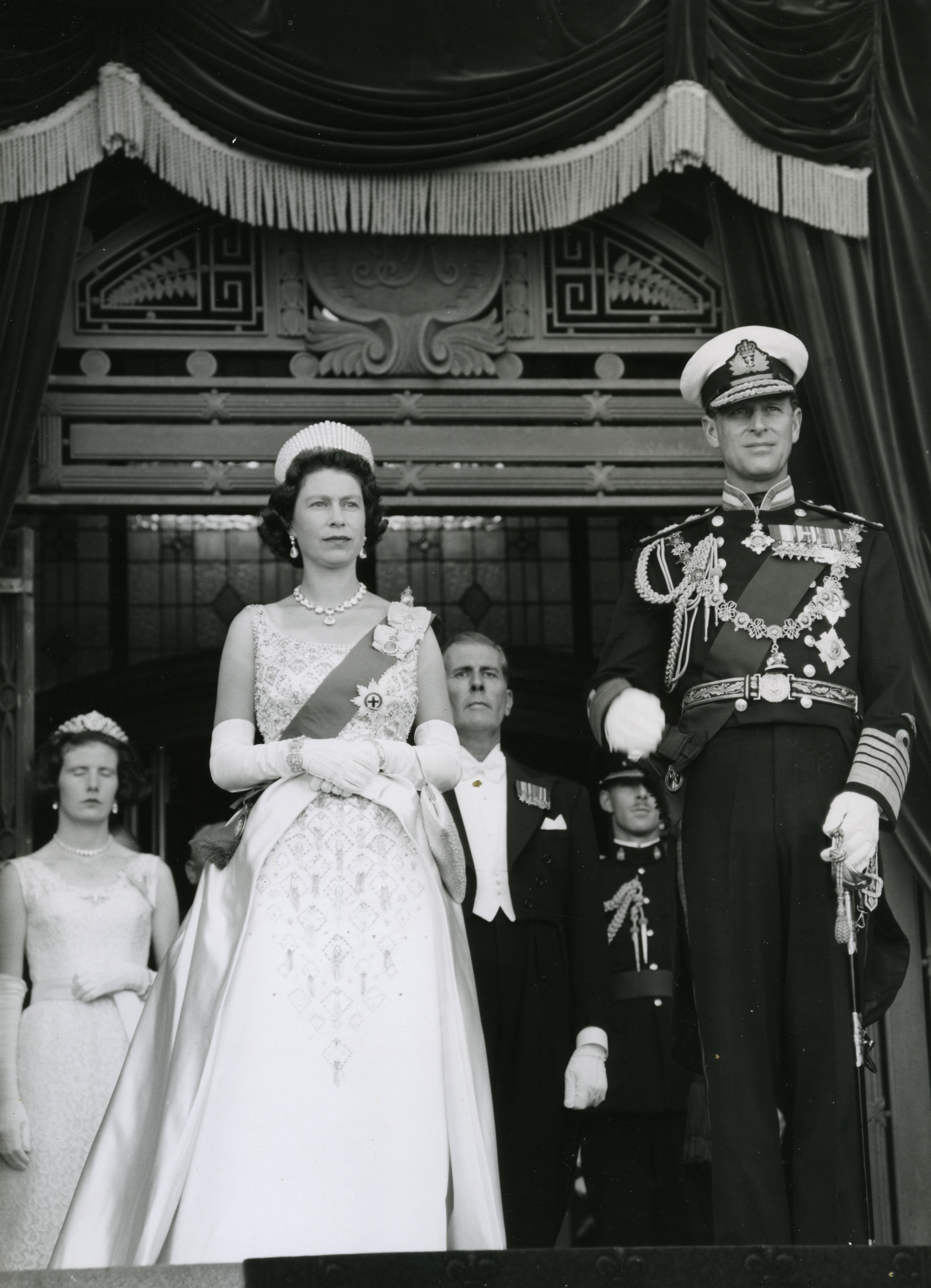
The Queen and the Duke of Edinburgh at the opening of the New Zealand Parliament in 1963

Date	Country	Host
20 January 1961	Cyprus	President Makarios III
20 January 1961	Akrotiri and Dhekelia	Administrator MacDonald
21 January – 1 February 1961; 16–26 February 1961; 1–2 March 1961	India	President Prasad
1–16 February 1961	Pakistan	President Ayub Khan
9–20 November 1961	Ghana	President Nkrumah
25 November – 1 December 1961	Sierra Leone	Governor-General Dorman
3–5 December 1961	Gambia	Governor Windley
30 January – 1 February 1963	Canada	Governor General Vanier
2–3 February 1963	Fiji	Governor Maddocks
6–18 February 1963	New Zealand	Governor-General Fergusson
18 February – 27 March 1963	Australia	Governor-General Sidney
5–13 October 1964	Canada	Governor General Vanier
1 February 1966	Canada (refueling)	Governor General Vanier
1 February 1966	Barbados	Governor Stow
4–5 February 1966	British Guiana	Governor Luyt
7–10 February 1966	Trinidad and Tobago	Governor-General Hochoy
11 February 1966	Grenada	Governor Turbott
13 February 1966	Saint Vincent and the Grenadines	Administrator Graham
14–15 February 1966	Barbados	Governor Stow
16 February 1966	Saint Lucia	Administrator Bryan
18 February 1966	Dominica	Administrator Guy
19 February 1966	Montserrat	Administrator Gibbs
20 February 1966	(Antigua and Barbuda) Antigua	Administrator Rose
22 February 1966	Saint Christopher-Nevis-Anguilla	Administrator Howard
23 February 1966	British Virgin Islands	Administrator Staveley
25 February 1966	Turks and Caicos Islands	Roger Tutt
27–28 February 1966	(The Bahamas) Bahamas	Governor Grey
3–6 March 1966	Jamaica	Governor-General Campbell
29 June – 5 July 1967	Canada	Governor General Michener
14–17 November 1967	Malta	Governor-General Dorman

== 1970s ==
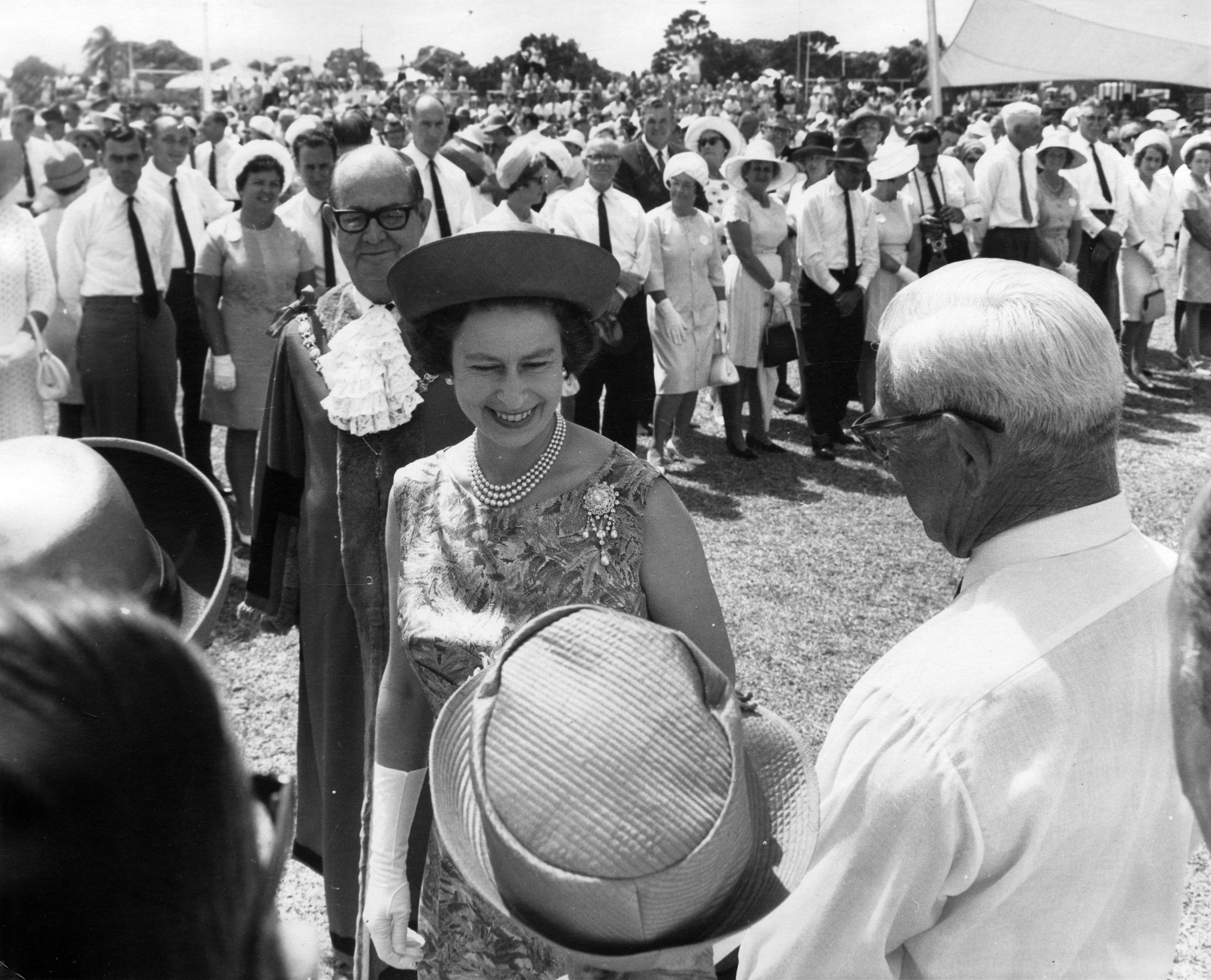
The Queen during a walkabout in Townsville, Australia, 1970

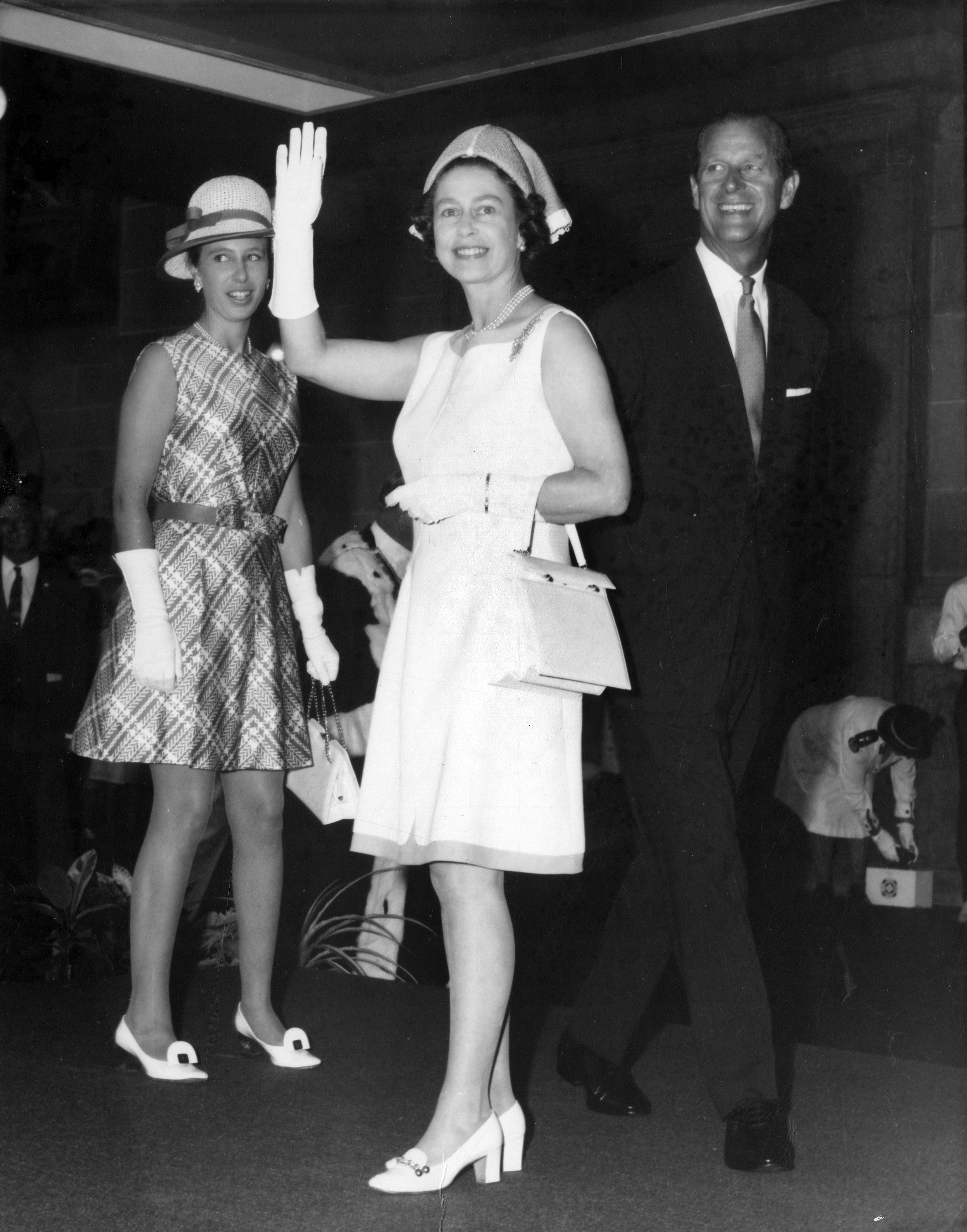
The Queen, the Duke of Edinburgh and Princess Anne during the 1970 Royal tour of Australia

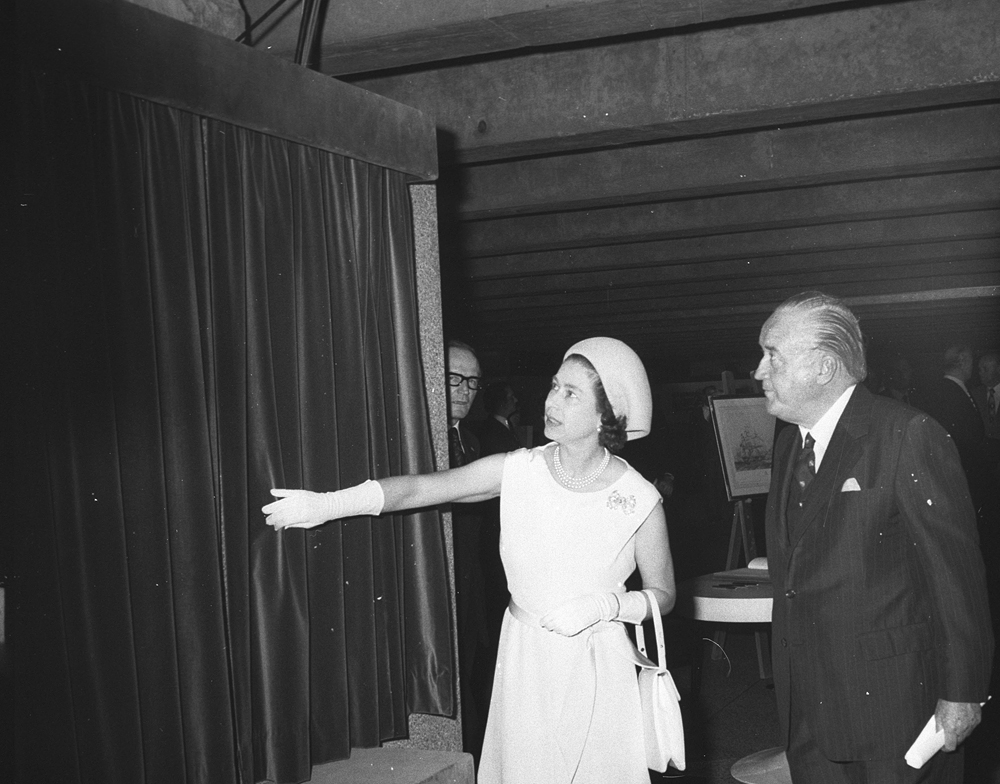
The Queen opening the Sydney Opera House, 20 October 1973

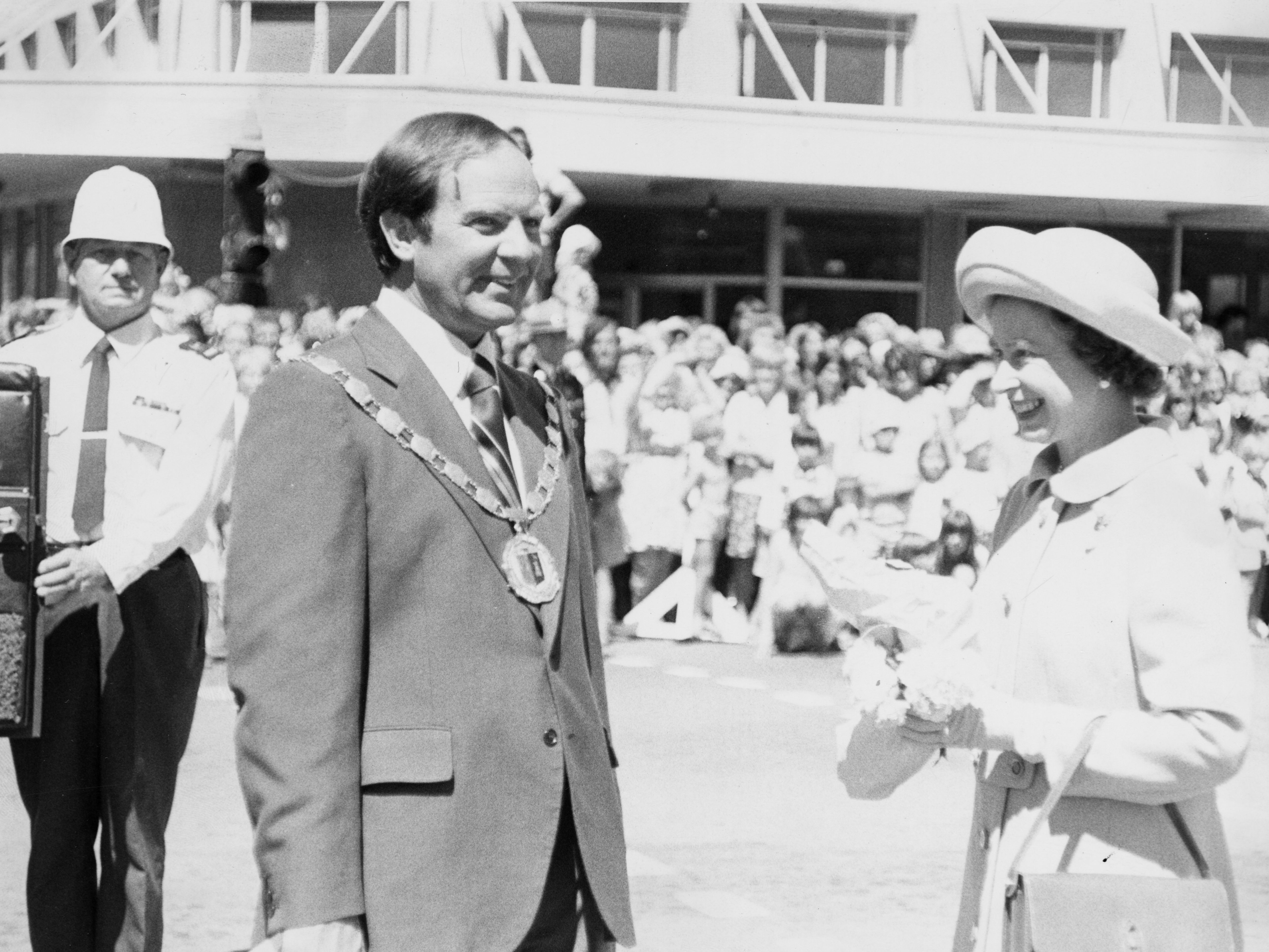
The Queen with the Brian Elwood, Mayor of Palmerston North, New Zealand, during a walkabout in The Square, 26 February 1977

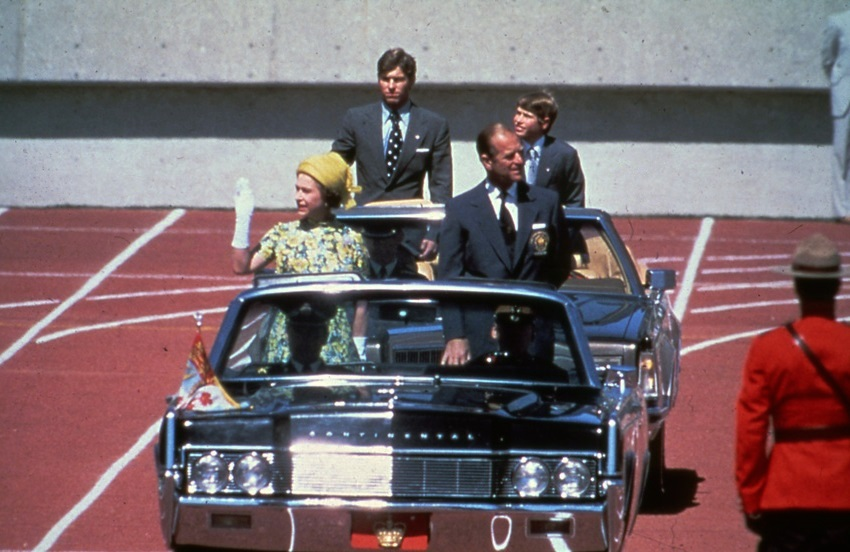
The Queen, the Duke of Edinburgh, Prince Andrew, Prince Edward at the opening of the 1978 Commonwealth Games in Edmonton, Alberta

Date	Country	Host
2–3 March 1970	Canada	Governor General Michener
4–5 March 1970	Fiji	Governor Foster
7 March 1970	Tonga	King Tāufaʻāhau Tupou IV
12–30 March 1970	New Zealand	Governor-General Porritt
30 March – 3 May 1970	Australia	Governor-General Hasluck
3–4 May 1970	Canada (refueling)	Governor General Michener
5–15 July 1970	Canada	Governor General Michener
3–12 May 1971	Canada	Governor General Michener
18–20 February 1972	Singapore	President Sheares
22–26, 28 February 1972	Malaysia	Yang di-Pertuan Agong Abdul Halim of Kedah
29 February 1972	Brunei	Sultan Hassanal Bolkiah
2 March 1972	Malaysia	Yang di-Pertuan Agong Abdul Halim of Kedah
5 March 1972	Singapore	President Sheares
6, 8 March 1972	Malaysia	Yang di-Pertuan Agong Abdul Halim of Kedah
19–20 March 1972	Seychelles	Governor Greatbatch
24–26 March 1972	Mauritius	Governor-General Williams
26 March 1972	Kenya	President Kenyatta
25 June – 5 July 1973	Canada	Governor General Michener
31 July – 4 August 1973	Canada (for 2nd CHOGM)	Governor General Michener
15 October 1973	Canada (refueling)	Governor General Michener
16–17 October 1973	Fiji	Governor-General Cakobau
17–22 October 1973	Australia	Governor-General Hasluck
27 January 1974	Canada (refueling)	Governor-General Léger
28–29 January 1974	Cook Islands	Governor-General Blundell
30 January – 8 February 1974	New Zealand (for 1974 British Commonwealth Games)	Governor-General Blundell
11 February 1974	(Australia) Norfolk Island	Administrator Pickerd
15–16 February 1974	New Hebrides	Resident Commissioner Houssemayne de Boulay
18–21 February 1974	Solomon Islands	Governor Luddington
22–27 February 1974	Papua New Guinea	High Commissioner Wilson Johnson
27–28 February 1974	Australia	Governor-General Hasluck
16–18 February 1975	Bermuda	Governor Leather
18–20 February 1975	Barbados	Governor-General Scott
20–21 February 1975	Bahamas	Governor-General Butler
1 March 1975	Bermuda (refueling)	Governor Leather
26–30 April 1975	Jamaica (for 3rd CHOGM)	Governor-General Glasspole
4–7 May 1975	Hong Kong	Governor MacLehose
3 July 1976	Bermuda	Governor Leather
13–25 July 1976	Canada (for 1976 Summer Olympics)	Governor General Léger
10–11 February 1977	Western Samoa	O le Ao o le Malo Malietoa Tanumafili II
14 February 1977	Tonga	King Tāufaʻāhau Tupou IV
16–17 February 1977	Fiji	Governor-General Cakobau
22 February – 7 March 1977	New Zealand	Governor-General Blundell
7–23 March 1977	Australia	Governor-General Kerr
23–26 March 1977	Papua New Guinea	Governor-General Lokoloko
26–30 March 1977	Australia	Governor-General Kerr
14–19 October 1977	Canada	Governor-General Léger
19–20 October 1977	Bahamas	Governor-General Butler
26 October 1977	British Virgin Islands	Governor Wallace
28 October 1977	Antigua and Barbuda	Governor Jacobs
31 October – 2 November 1977	Barbados	Governor-General Ward
26 July – 6 August 1978	Canada	Governor General Léger
19–22 July 1979	Tanzania	President Nyerere
22–25 July 1979	Malawi	President Banda
25–27 July 1979	Botswana	President Khama
27 July – 4 August 1979	Zambia (for 5th CHOGM)	President Kaunda

== 1980s ==
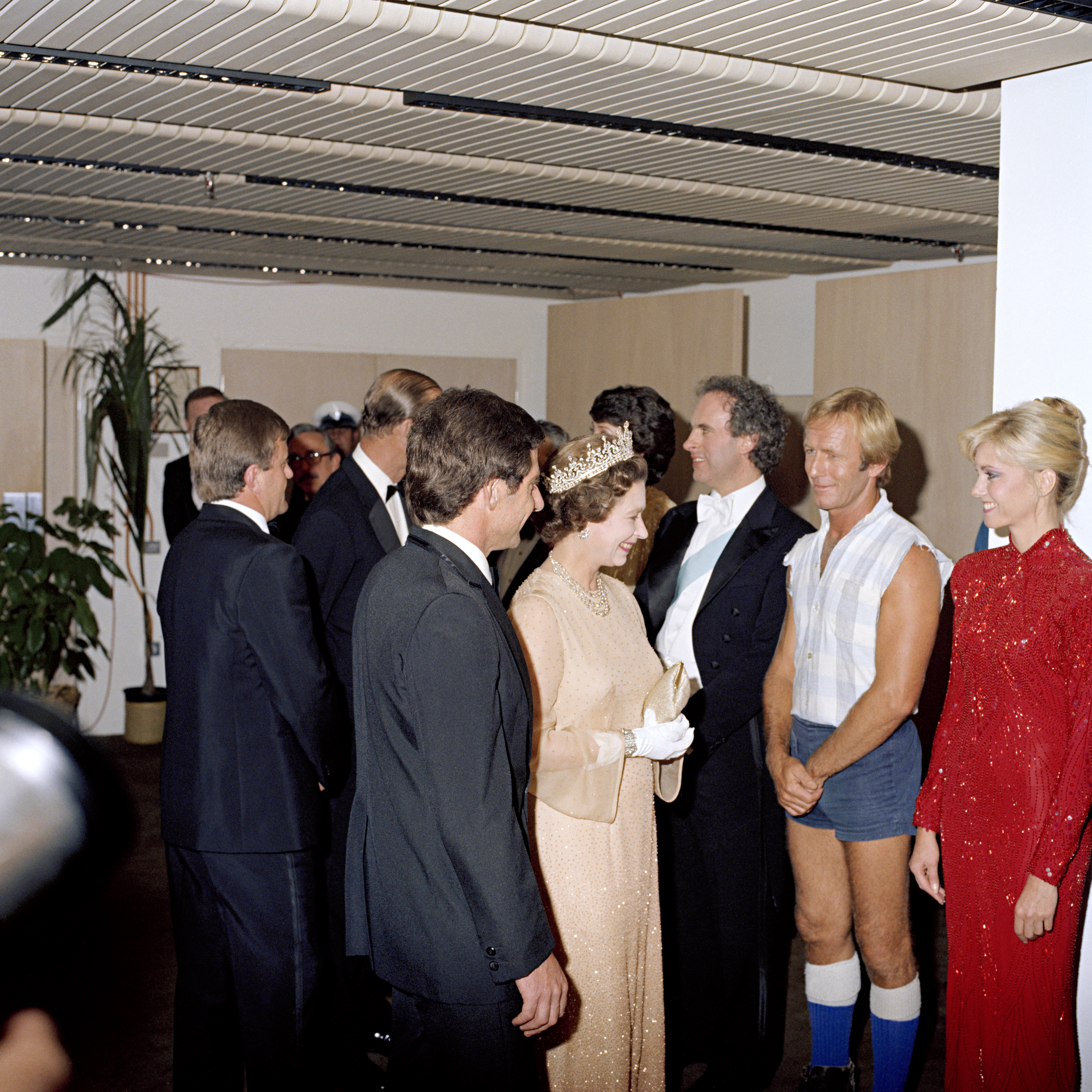
The Queen meeting Australian entertainers who performed in a Royal Charity Concert at the Sydney Opera House, 1980

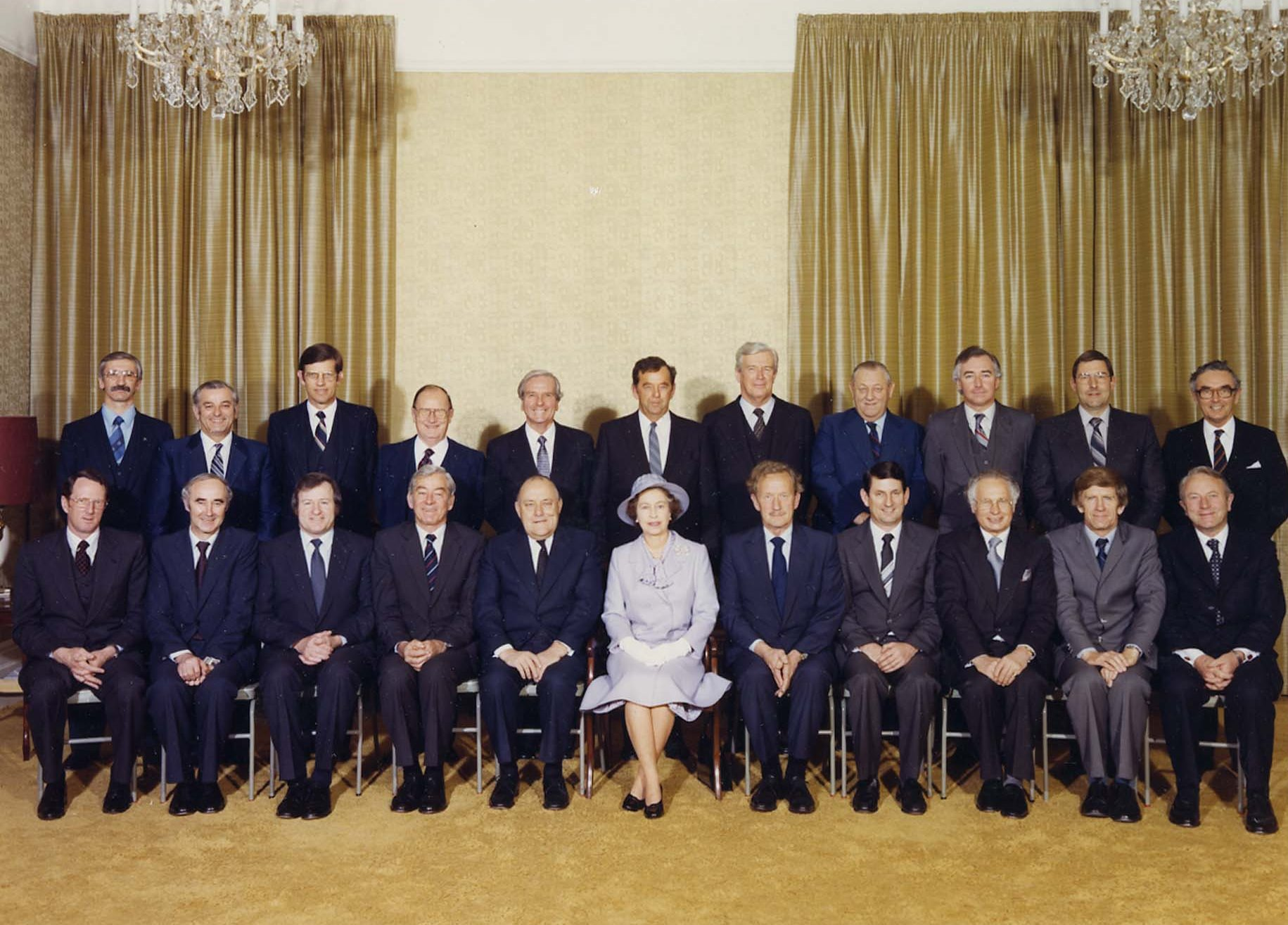
The Queen posing with the New Zealand Cabinet during her visit to New Zealand, 1981

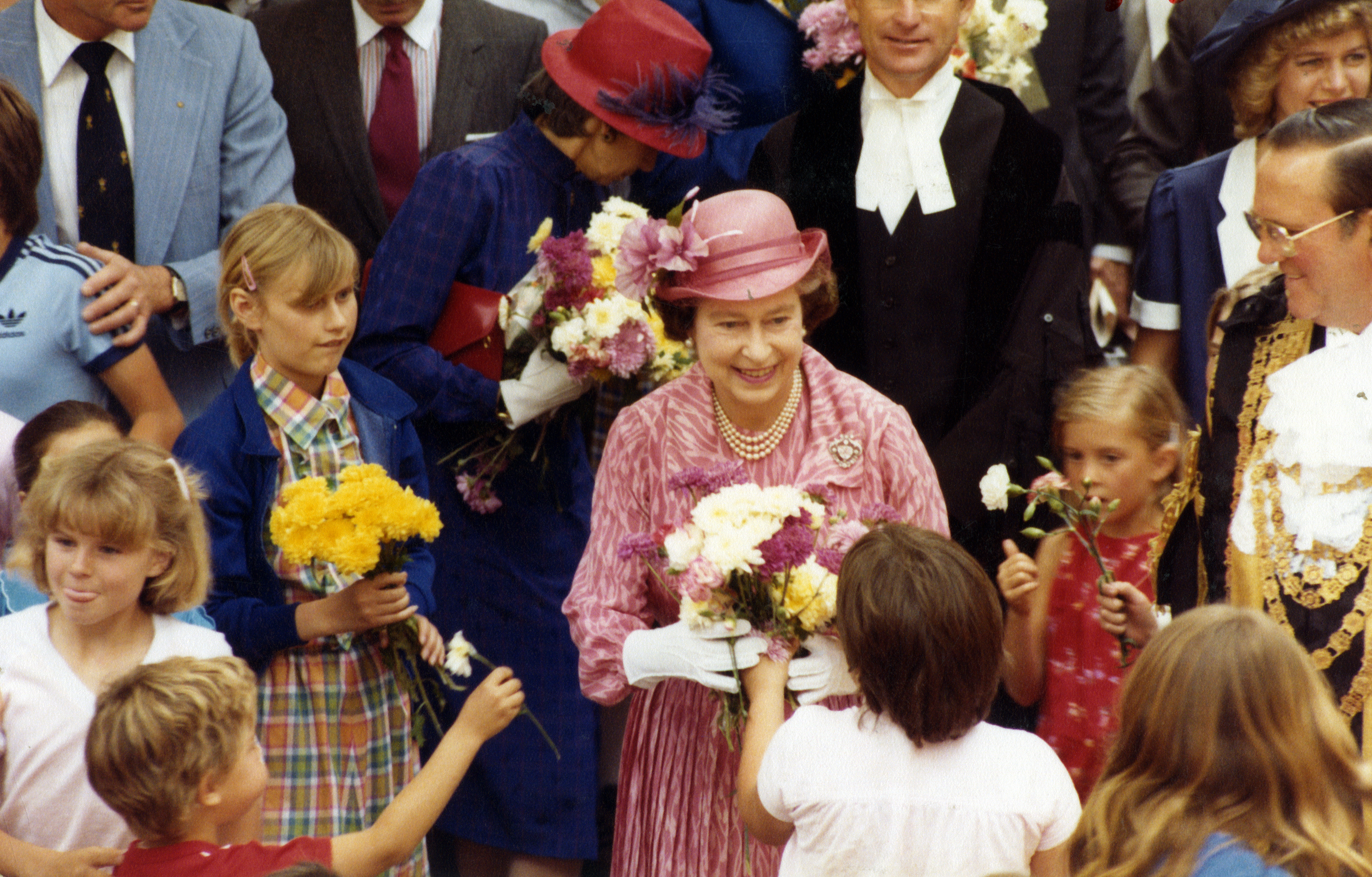
The Queen surrounded by children in Queen Street Mall, Brisbane City, 1982

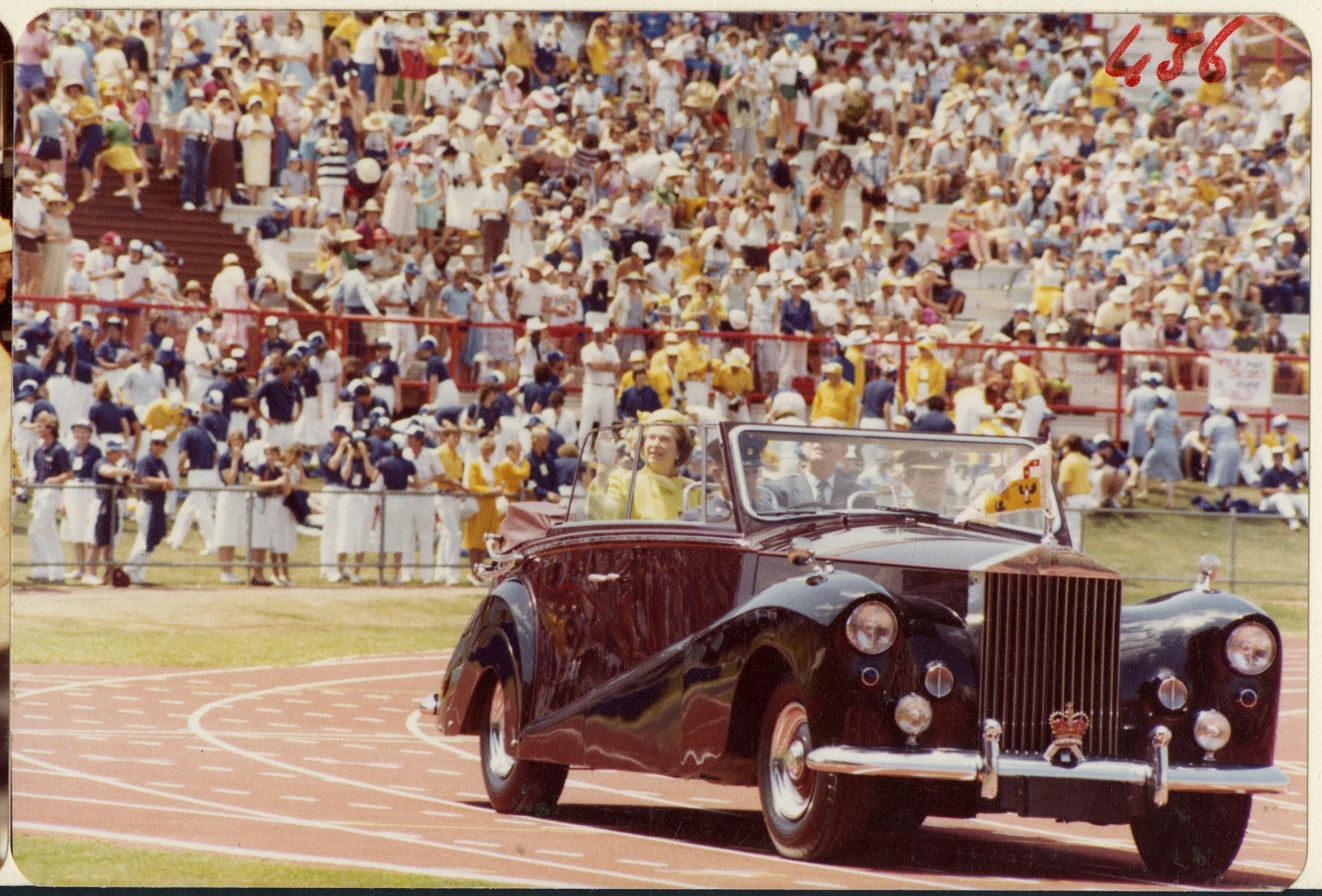
The Queen and the Duke of Edinburgh at the Closing Ceremony of the XII Commonwealth Games, Brisbane, 1982

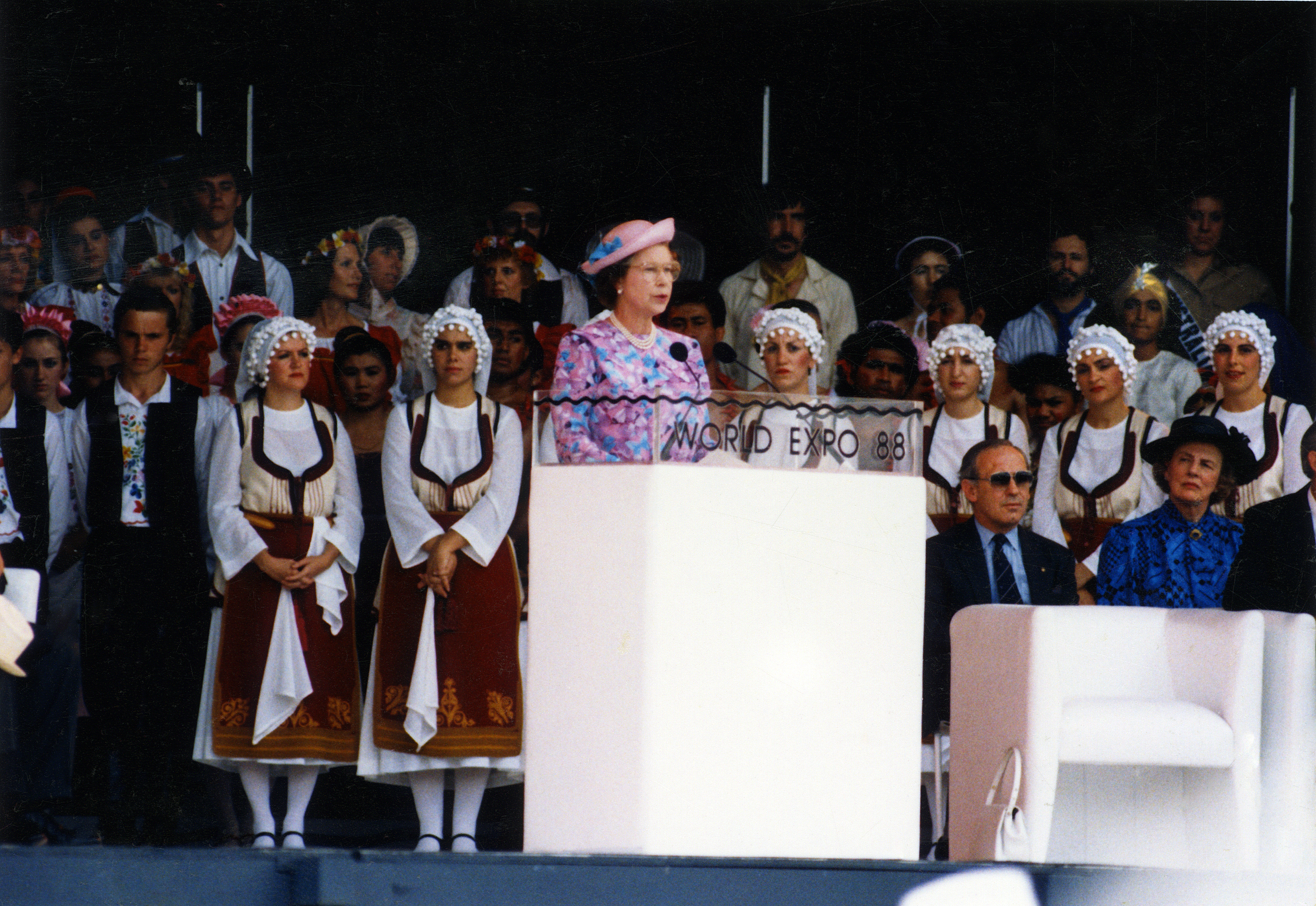
The Queen opening World Expo 88 at Brisbane, 30 April 1988

Date	Country	Host
24–28 May 1980	Australia	Governor-General Cowen
26 September – 12 October 1981	Australia (for 6th CHOGM)	Governor-General Cowen
12–20 October 1981	New Zealand	Governor-General Beattie
20–21 October 1981	Australia	Governor-General Cowen
21–25 October 1981	Sri Lanka	President Jayawardene
15–18 April 1982	Canada	Governor General Schreyer
5–13 October 1982	Australia	Governor-General Stephen
13–14 October 1982	Papua New Guinea	Governor-General Lokoloko
18 October 1982	Solomon Islands	Governor-General Devesi
21 October 1982	Nauru	President DeRoburt
23 October 1982	Kiribati	President Tabai
26–27 October 1982	Tuvalu	Governor-General Teo
30 October – 1 November 1982	Fiji	Governor-General Cakobau
13 February 1983	Bermuda	Governor Posnett
13–16 February 1983	Jamaica	Governor-General Glasspole
16–17 February 1983	Cayman Islands	Governor Lloyd
8–11 March 1983	Canada	Governor General Schreyer
9–10 November 1983	Cyprus	President Kyprianou
10–14 November 1983	Kenya	President Moi
14–17 November 1983	Bangladesh	President Chowdhury
17–26 November 1983	India (for 7th CHOGM)	President Singh
25–26 March 1984	Cyprus	President Kyprianou
24 September – 7 October 1984	Canada	Governor General Sauvé
9–11 October 1985	Belize	Governor-General Gordon
11–18 October 1985	Bahamas (for 8th CHOGM)	Governor-General Cash
20 October 1985	(The Bahamas) Inagua (private)	
23 October 1985	Saint Kitts and Nevis	Governor-General Arrindell
24 October 1985	Antigua and Barbuda	Governor-General Jacobs
25 October 1985	Dominica	President Seignoret
26 October 1985	Saint Lucia	Governor-General Lewis
27 October 1985	Saint Vincent and the Grenadines	Governor-General Eustace
28–29 October 1985	Barbados	Governor-General Springer
31 October 1985	Grenada	Governor-General Scoon
1–3 November 1985	Trinidad and Tobago	President Clarke
22 February – 2 March 1986	New Zealand	Governor-General Reeves
2–13 March 1986	Australia	Governor-General Stephen
21–23 October 1986	Hong Kong	Governor Youde
9–24 October 1987	Canada (for 10th CHOGM)	Governor General Sauvé
19 April – 10 May 1988	Australia	Governor-General Stephen
8–11 March 1989	Barbados	Governor-General Springer
9–11 October 1989	Singapore	President Wee
14–17 October 1989	Malaysia (for 11th CHOGM)	Yang di-Pertuan Agong Azlan Shah of Perak

== 1990s ==
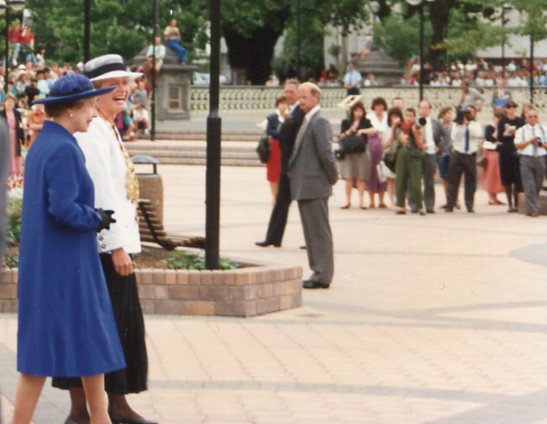
The Queen with the Mayor of Christchurch Vicki Buck, during a walkabout in Victoria Square, Christchurch, New Zealand, February 1990

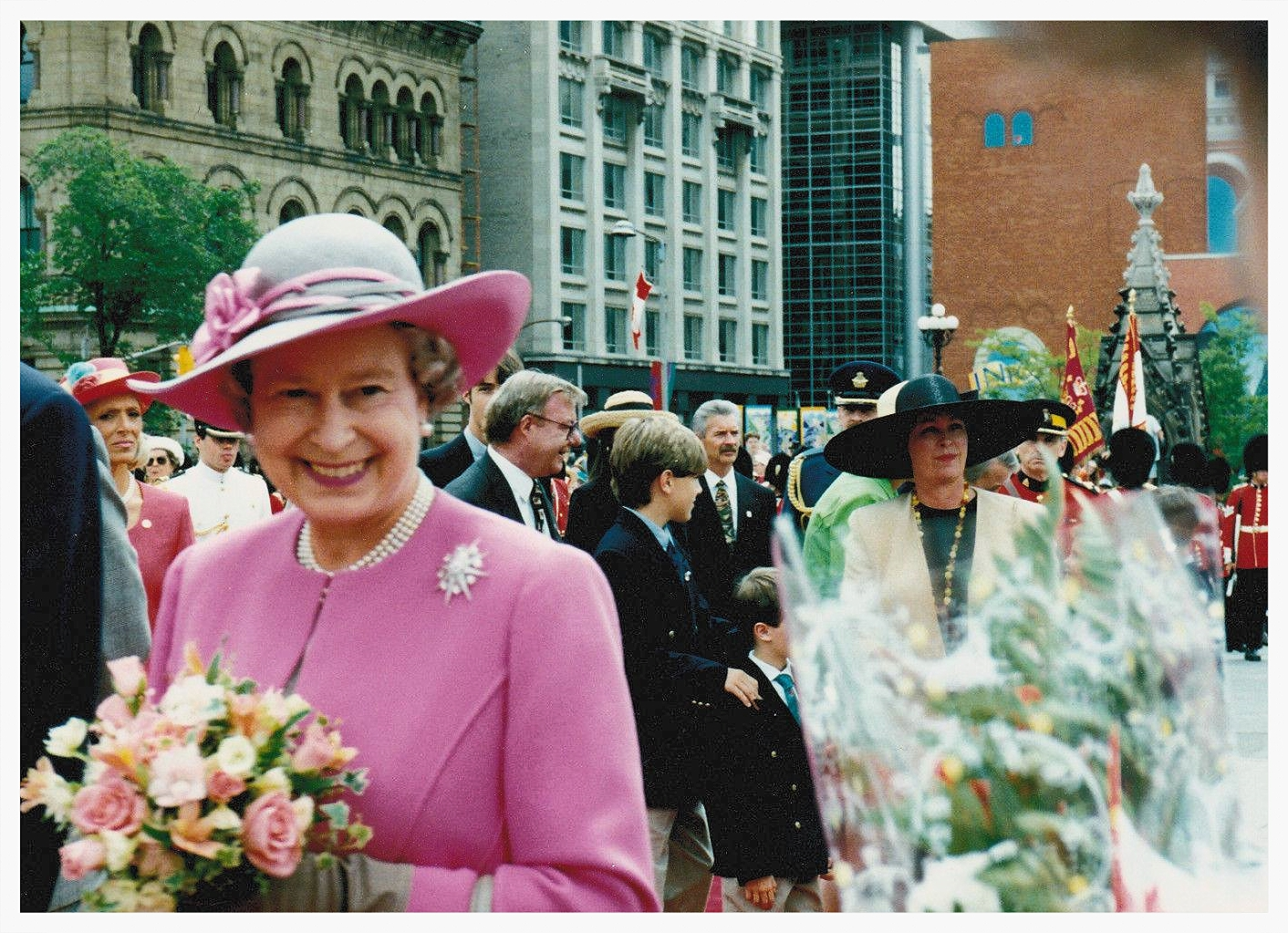
The Queen in Ottawa in 1992 to celebrate her Ruby Jubilee and the 125th anniversary of the Canadian Confederation

Date	Country	Host
1–16 February 1990	New Zealand	Governor-General Reeves
27 June – 1 July 1990	Canada	Governor General Hnatyshyn
7 October 1991	Kenya (overnight stop)	President Moi
8–10 October 1991	Namibia	President Nujoma
10–15 October 1991	Zimbabwe (for 12th CHOGM)	President Mugabe
18–25 February 1992	Australia	Governor-General Hayden
28–30 May 1992	Malta	President Tabone
30 June – 2 July 1992	Canada	Governor General Hnatyshyn
18–24 October 1993	Cyprus (for 13th CHOGM)	President Clerides
23 October 1993	Akrotiri and Dhekelia	Administrator Harley
18 February 1994	Anguilla	Governor Shave
19 February 1994	Dominica	President Sorhaindo
19–22 February 1994	Guyana	President Jagan
22–24 February 1994	Belize	Governor-General Young
26–27 February 1994	Cayman Islands	Governor Gore
1–3 March 1994	Jamaica	Governor-General Cooke
6–8 March 1994	Bahamas	Governor-General Darling
8–10 March 1994	Bermuda	Governor Waddington
13–22 August 1994	Canada	Governor General Hnatyshyn
19–25 March 1995	South Africa	President Mandela
30 October – 11 November 1995	New Zealand (for 14th CHOGM)	Governor-General Tizard
23 June – 2 July 1997	Canada	Governor General LeBlanc
6–12 October 1997	Pakistan	President Leghari
12–18 October 1997	India	President Narayanan
17–20 September 1998	Brunei	Sultan Hassanal Bolkiah
20–23 September 1998	Malaysia	Yang di-Pertuan Agong Jaafar of Negeri Sembilan
7–9 November 1999	Ghana	President Rawlings
9–15 November 1999	South Africa (for 16th CHOGM)	President Mbeki
15 November 1999	Mozambique	President Chissano

== 2000s ==
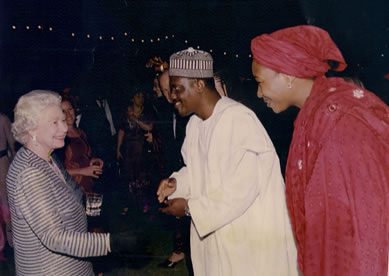
The Queen with Saidu Samaila Sambawa in Nigeria, 2003

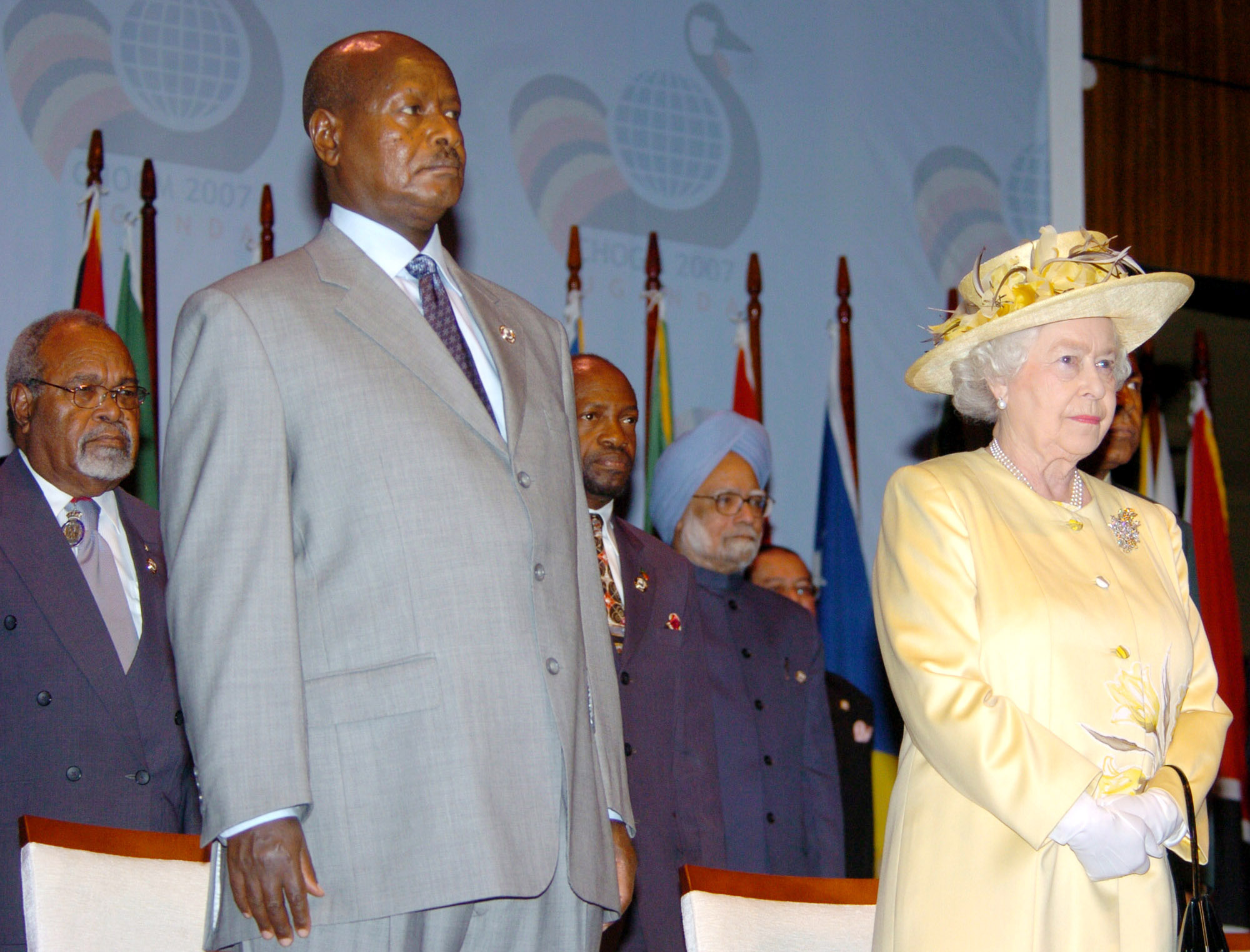
The Queen with the President of Uganda Yoweri Kaguta Museveni at CHOGM in Kampala, Uganda, 2007

Date	Country	Host
17 March – 1 April 2000	Australia	Governor-General Deane
18–20 February 2002	Jamaica	Governor-General Cooke
22–27 February 2002	New Zealand	Governor-General Cartwright
27 February – 3 March 2002	Australia (for 17th CHOGM)	Governor-General Hollingworth
4–15 October 2002	Canada	Governor General Clarkson
3–6 December 2003	Nigeria (for 18th CHOGM)	President Obasanjo
17–25 May 2005	Canada	Governor General Clarkson
23–26 November 2005	Malta (for 19th CHOGM)	President Fenech Adami
11–16 March 2006	Australia	Governor-General Jeffery
16–18 March 2006	Singapore	President Nathan
20 November 2007	Malta	President Fenech Adami
21–24 November 2007	Uganda (for 20th CHOGM)	President Museveni
24–26 November 2009	Bermuda	Governor Gozney
26–28 November 2009	Trinidad and Tobago (for 21st CHOGM)	President Richards

== 2010s ==
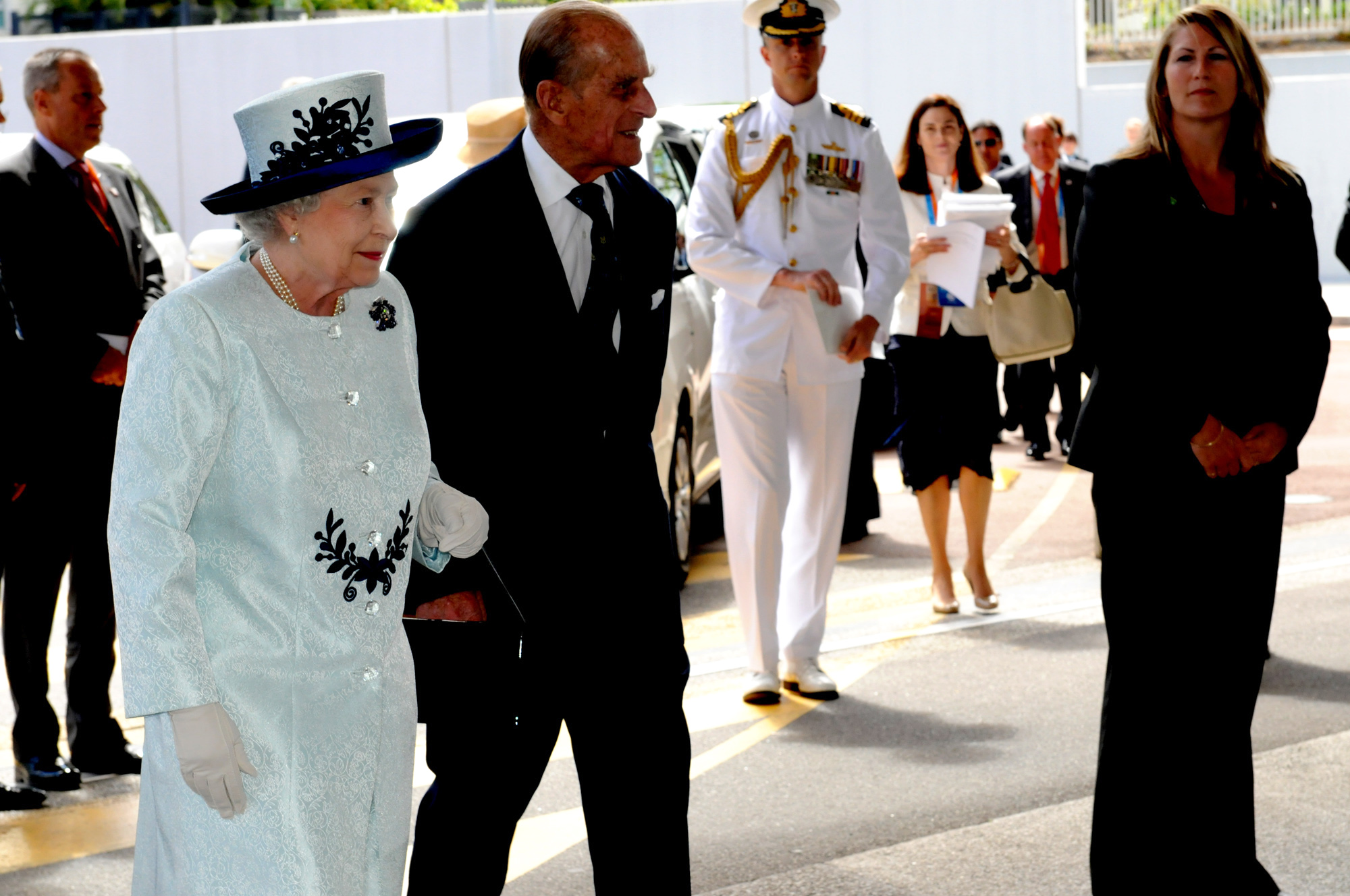
The Queen with the Duke of Edinburgh arriving at Perth Convention and Exhibition Centre to inaugurate the CHOGM Summit, 28 October 2011

Date	Country	Host
28 June – 6 July 2010	Canada	Governor General Jean
19–29 October 2011	Australia (for 22nd CHOGM)	Governor-General Bryce
26–28 November 2015	Malta (for 24th CHOGM)	President Coleiro Preca

== Commonwealth countries and territories never visited by Elizabeth II ==
British overseas territories
British Antarctic Territory
British Indian Ocean Territory
Falkland Islands
Pitcairn Islands, Henderson, Ducie and Oeno Islands
Saint Helena, Ascension and Tristan da Cunha (never visited as Queen)
South Georgia and the South Sandwich Islands

Other territories
Australian Antarctic Territory (external territory of Australia) (Note: Though nominally called territories, these regions are constitutionally integrated into their respective countries.)
Ashmore and Cartier Islands (external territory of Australia)
Christmas Island (external territory of Australia)
Coral Sea Islands (external territory of Australia)
Heard Island and McDonald Islands (external territory of Australia)
Niue (Realm of New Zealand)
Ross Dependency (dependency of New Zealand)
Tokelau (dependency of New Zealand)

Commonwealth countries
Cameroon
Eswatini (never visited as Queen)
Gabon
Lesotho (never visited as Queen)
Maldives (never visited while the country has been a member)
Rwanda
Togo

== See also ==
- List of state visits made by Elizabeth II
- List of state visits received by Elizabeth II
- List of state and official visits by Canada
- Royal tours of Australia
- Royal tours of Canada
- List of official overseas trips made by George VI
- List of official overseas trips made by Queen Elizabeth the Queen Mother
- List of official overseas trips made by Charles III
- List of official overseas trips made by William, Prince of Wales
- List of official overseas trips made by Catherine, Princess of Wales
- List of official overseas trips made by Prince Harry, Duke of Sussex, and Meghan, Duchess of Sussex
