= Elizabeth II =

Queen of the United Kingdom from 1952 to 2022

- Head of the Commonwealth
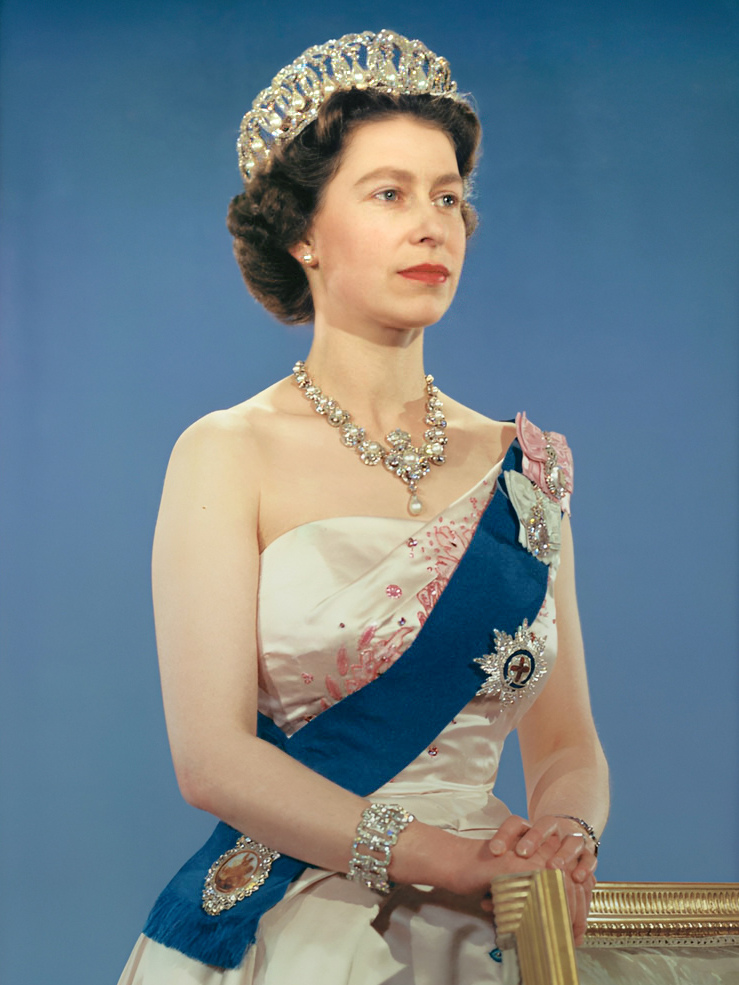
- Formal portrait, 1959

Queen of the United Kingdom and other Commonwealth realms
- Reign: 6 February 1952 – 8 September 2022
- Coronation: 2 June 1953
- Predecessor: George VI
- Successor: Charles III
- Born: Princess Elizabeth of York; 21 April 1926; 17 Bruton Street, Mayfair, London, England
- Died: 8 September 2022 (aged 96); Balmoral Castle, Aberdeenshire, Scotland
- Burial: 19 September 2022; King George VI Memorial Chapel, St George's Chapel, Windsor Castle
- Spouse: Prince Philip, Duke of Edinburgh (m. 1947; died 2021)
- Issue: Charles III; Anne, Princess Royal; Andrew Mountbatten-Windsor; Prince Edward, Duke of Edinburgh
Names
- Elizabeth Alexandra Mary
- House: Windsor
- Father: George VI
- Mother: Elizabeth Bowes-Lyon
- Religion: Protestant (Note: As monarch, Elizabeth was Supreme Governor of the Church of England and a member of the Church of Scotland.)
- Elizabeth II's voice Coronation Day speech Recorded 2 June 1953

Elizabeth II (Elizabeth Alexandra Mary; 21 April 1926 – 8 September 2022) was Queen of the United Kingdom and other Commonwealth realms from 6 February 1952 until her death in 2022. She was queen regnant of 32 sovereign states during her lifetime and was the monarch of 15 realms at her death. Her reign of 70 years and 214 days is the longest of any British monarch, the second-longest of any sovereign state, and the longest of any queen regnant in history.

Elizabeth was born in Mayfair, London, during the reign of her paternal grandfather, King George V. She was the first child of the Duke and Duchess of York (later King George VI and Queen Elizabeth the Queen Mother). Her father acceded to the throne in 1936 upon the abdication of his brother Edward VIII, making the ten-year-old Princess Elizabeth the heir presumptive. She was educated privately at home and began to undertake public duties during the Second World War, serving in the Auxiliary Territorial Service. In November 1947, she married a former prince of Greece and Denmark, Philip Mountbatten. They had four children: Charles, Anne, Andrew, and Edward.

When her father died in February 1952, Elizabeth, then 25 years old, became queen of seven independent Commonwealth countries and head of the Commonwealth. She reigned as a constitutional monarch through times of significant political change such as the Troubles in Northern Ireland, devolution in the United Kingdom, the decolonisation of Africa, and the United Kingdom's accession to the European Communities as well as its subsequent withdrawal. The number of her realms varied over time as territories gained independence and as most realms became republics. As queen, Elizabeth was advised by more than 170 prime ministers across her realms. Her many historic visits and meetings included state visits to China in 1986, to Russia in 1994, and to the Republic of Ireland in 2011; she met five popes and fourteen US presidents.

Significant events of Elizabeth's reign included her coronation in 1953 and the celebrations of her Silver, Golden, Diamond, and Platinum jubilees. Although there was occasional republican sentiment and media criticism of her family – particularly after the breakdowns of her children's marriages, her annus horribilis in 1992, and the death of her former daughter-in-law Diana in 1997 – support for the monarchy and her popularity in the United Kingdom remained consistently high. Elizabeth died aged 96 at Balmoral Castle in Scotland, and was succeeded by her eldest son, Charles III.

== Early life ==
Elizabeth was born at 2:40 am on 21 April 1926 by Caesarean section at her maternal grandfather's London home, 17 Bruton Street in Mayfair, the first child of Prince Albert, Duke of York (later King George VI), and his wife, Elizabeth, Duchess of York (later Queen Elizabeth the Queen Mother). Her father was the second son of King George V and Queen Mary, and her mother was the youngest daughter of Scottish aristocrat Claude Bowes-Lyon, 14th Earl of Strathmore and Kinghorne, and his wife Cecilia (née Cavendish-Bentinck). She was baptised in the private chapel at Buckingham Palace on 29 May by the Archbishop of York, Cosmo Gordon Lang, (Note: Her godparents were: King George V and Queen Mary; Lord Strathmore; Prince Arthur, Duke of Connaught and Strathearn (her paternal great-granduncle); Princess Mary, Viscountess Lascelles (her paternal aunt); and Lady Elphinstone (her maternal aunt).) and was named Elizabeth after her mother; Alexandra after her paternal great-grandmother, who had died five months earlier; and Mary after her paternal grandmother. Her close family affectionately called her "Lilibet", based on what she called herself at first. She was cherished by her grandfather George V, whom she affectionately called "Grandpa England", and her regular visits during his serious illness in 1929 were credited in the popular press and by later biographers with raising his spirits and aiding his recovery.

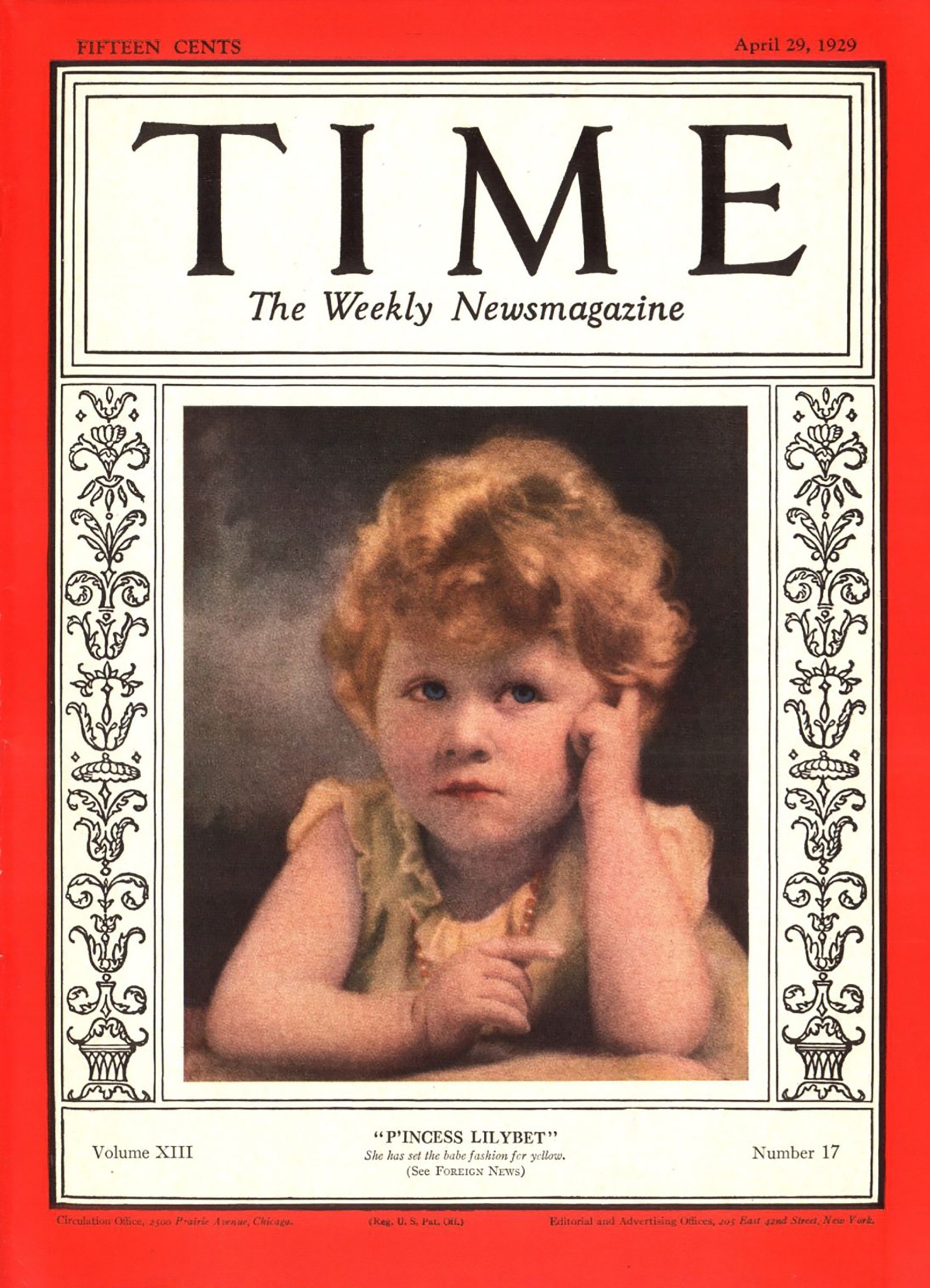
On the cover of Time, April 1929

Portrait by Philip de László, 1933

Elizabeth's sole sibling, Princess Margaret, was born in 1930. They were cared for by their nanny, Clara Knight, and educated at home under the supervision of their mother and their governess, Marion Crawford. Lessons concentrated on history, language, literature, and music. Crawford published a biography of Elizabeth and Margaret's childhood years titled The Little Princesses in 1950, much to the dismay of the royal family. The book describes Elizabeth's love of horses and dogs, her orderliness, and her attitude of responsibility. Others echoed such observations: Winston Churchill described Elizabeth when she was two as "a character. She has an air of authority and reflectiveness astonishing in an infant." Her cousin Margaret Rhodes described her as "a jolly little girl, but fundamentally sensible and well-behaved". Elizabeth's early life was spent primarily at the Yorks' residences at 145 Piccadilly (their town house in London) and Royal Lodge in Windsor.

== Heir presumptive ==
During her grandfather's reign, Elizabeth was third in the line of succession to the British throne, behind her uncle Edward, Prince of Wales, and her father. Although her birth generated public interest, she was not expected to become queen, as Edward was still young and expected to marry and have children of his own, who would precede Elizabeth in the line of succession. When her grandfather died in 1936 and her uncle succeeded as Edward VIII, she became second in line to the throne, after her father. Later that year, Edward abdicated, after his proposed marriage to divorced American socialite Wallis Simpson provoked a constitutional crisis. Consequently, Elizabeth's father became king, taking the regnal name George VI. Since Elizabeth had no brothers, she became heir presumptive. If her parents had subsequently had a son, he would have been heir apparent and ahead of her in the line of succession, which was determined by the male-preference primogeniture in effect at the time.

Elizabeth received private tuition in constitutional history from Henry Marten, Vice-Provost of Eton College, and learned French from a succession of native-speaking governesses. A Girl Guides company, the 1st Buckingham Palace Company, was formed specifically so she could socialise with girls her age. Later, she was enrolled as a Sea Ranger.

In 1939, Elizabeth's parents toured Canada and the United States. As in 1927, when they had toured Australia and New Zealand, Elizabeth remained in Britain since her father thought she was too young to undertake public tours. She "looked tearful" as her parents departed. They corresponded regularly, and she and her parents made the first royal transatlantic telephone call on 18 May.

=== Second World War ===
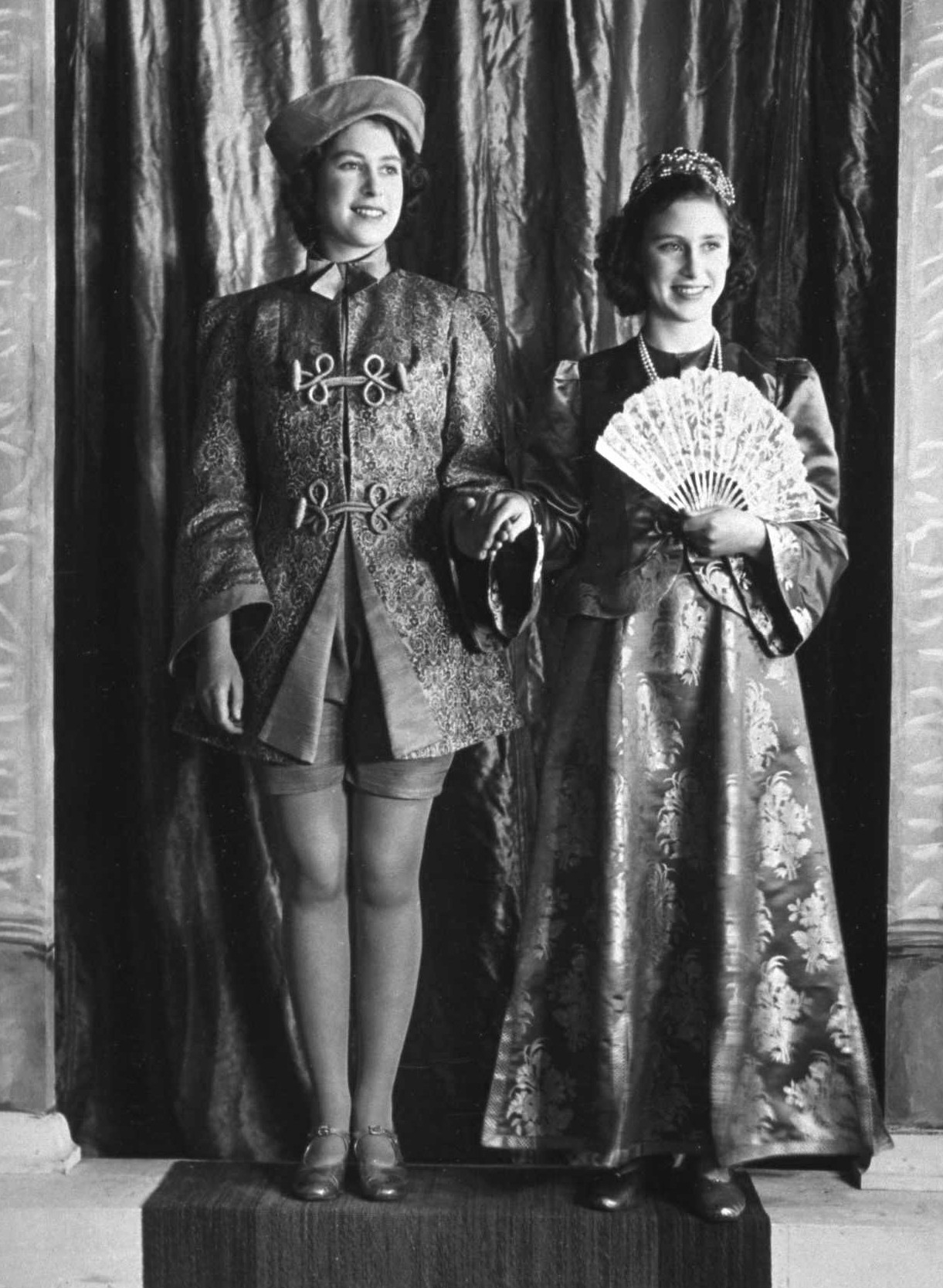
With Margaret in their production of Aladdin, part of their wartime Christmas pantomimes, 1943

In September 1939, Britain entered the Second World War. Lord Hailsham suggested that Elizabeth and Margaret should be evacuated to Canada to avoid the frequent aerial bombings of London by the Luftwaffe. This was rejected by their mother, who declared, "The children won't go without me. I won't leave without the King. And the King will never leave." The princesses stayed at Balmoral Castle, Scotland, until Christmas 1939, when they moved to Sandringham House, Norfolk. From February to May 1940, they lived at Royal Lodge, Windsor, until moving to Windsor Castle, where they lived for most of the next five years. At Windsor, the princesses staged pantomimes at Christmas in aid of the Queen's Wool Fund, which bought yarn to knit into military garments. In 1940, the 14-year-old Elizabeth made her first radio broadcast during the BBC's Children's Hour, addressing other children who had been evacuated from the cities. She stated: "We are trying to do all we can to help our gallant sailors, soldiers, and airmen, and we are trying, too, to bear our own share of the danger and sadness of war. We know, every one of us, that in the end all will be well."

In 1943, Elizabeth undertook her first solo public appearance on a visit to the Grenadier Guards, of which she had been appointed colonel the previous year. As she approached her 18th birthday, Parliament changed the law so that she could act as one of five counsellors of state in the event of her father's incapacity or absence abroad, such as his visit to Italy in July 1944. In February 1945, she was appointed an honorary second subaltern in the Auxiliary Territorial Service with the service number 230873. She trained as a driver and mechanic and was given the rank of honorary junior commander (female equivalent of captain at the time) five months later.

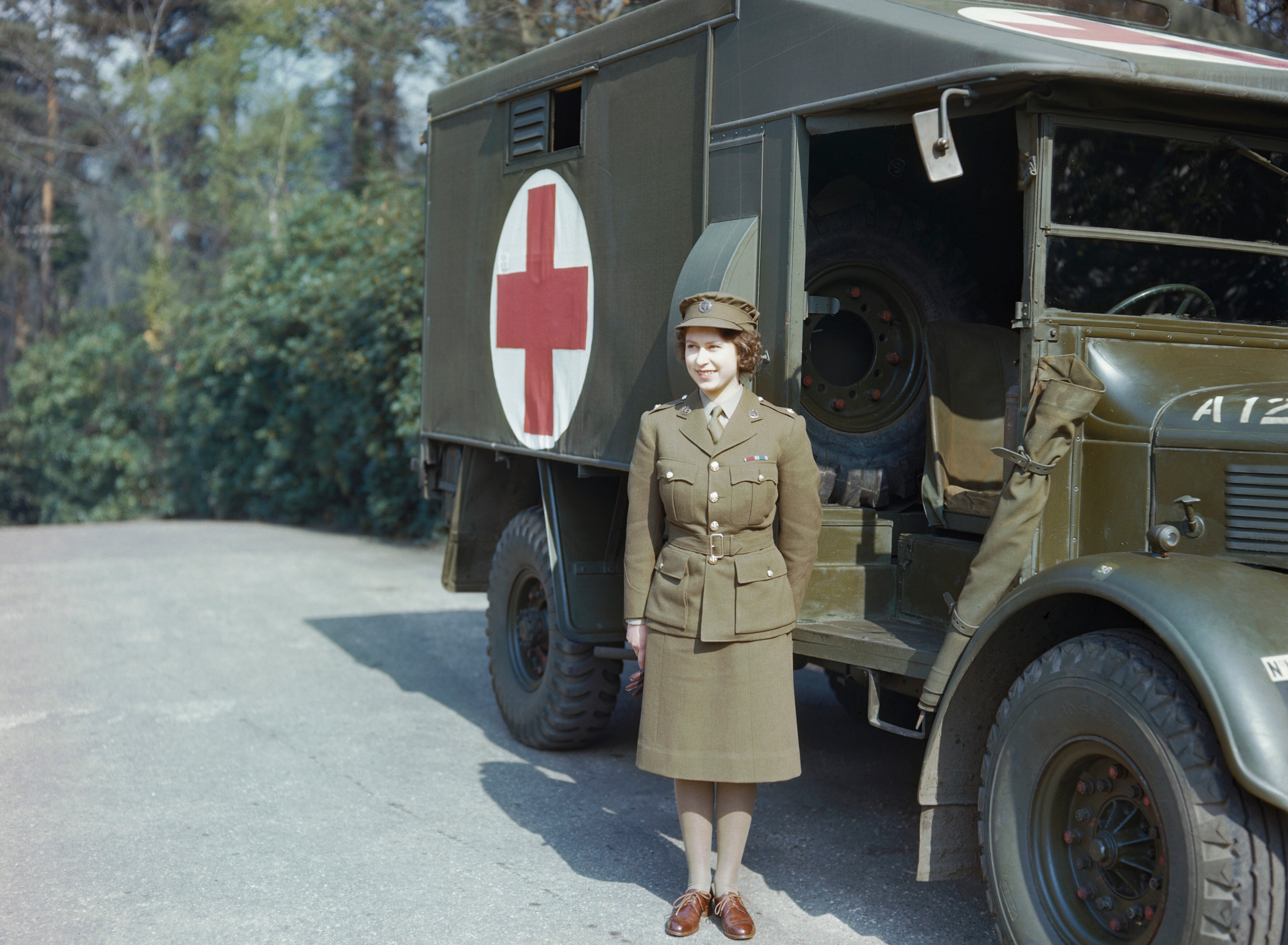
In Auxiliary Territorial Service uniform, 1945

At the end of the war in Europe, on Victory in Europe Day, Elizabeth and Margaret mingled incognito with the celebrating crowds in the streets of London. In 1985, Elizabeth recalled in a rare interview, "... we asked my parents if we could go out and see for ourselves. I remember we were terrified of being recognised ... I remember lines of unknown people linking arms and walking down Whitehall, all of us just swept along on a tide of happiness and relief."

During the war, plans were drawn to quell Welsh nationalism by affiliating Elizabeth more closely with Wales. Proposals, such as appointing her Constable of Caernarfon Castle or a patron of Urdd Gobaith Cymru (the Welsh League of Youth), were abandoned for several reasons, including fear of associating Elizabeth with conscientious objectors in the Urdd at a time when Britain was at war. Welsh politicians suggested she be made Princess of Wales on her 18th birthday. Home Secretary Herbert Morrison supported the idea, but the King rejected it because he felt such a title belonged solely to the wife of a prince of Wales and the prince of Wales had always been the heir apparent. In 1946, she was inducted into the Gorsedd of Bards at the National Eisteddfod of Wales.

Elizabeth went on her first overseas tour in 1947, accompanying her parents through southern Africa. During the tour, in a broadcast to the British Commonwealth on her 21st birthday, she made the following pledge: (Note: The oft-quoted speech was written by Dermot Morrah, a journalist for The Times.)

I declare before you all that my whole life, whether it be long or short, shall be devoted to your service and the service of our great imperial family to which we all belong. But I shall not have strength to carry out this resolution alone unless you join in it with me, as I now invite you to do: I know that your support will be unfailingly given. God help me to make good my vow, and God bless all of you who are willing to share in it.

=== Marriage ===
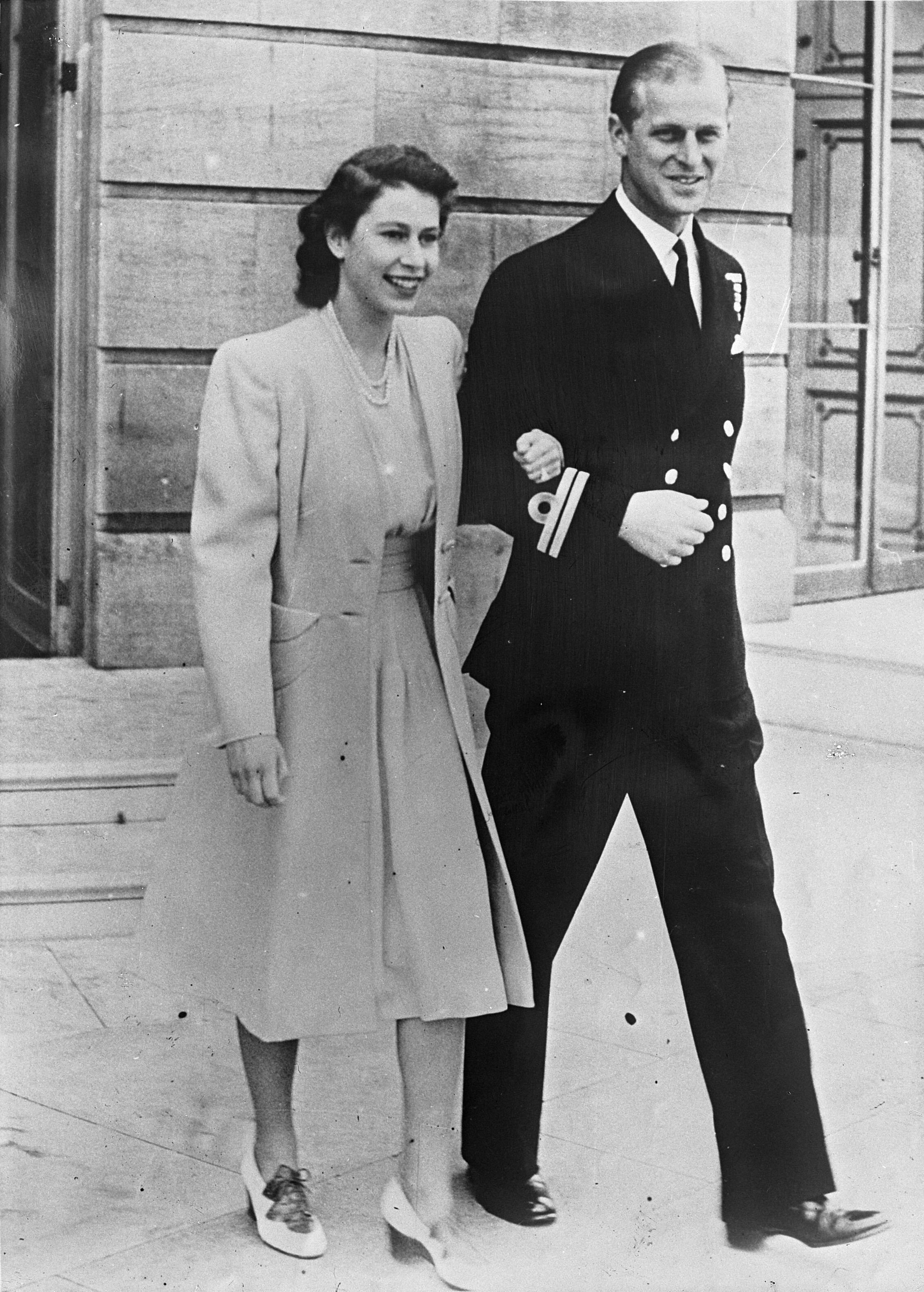
With Philip, days after their engagement was officially announced, 1947

Elizabeth met her future husband, Prince Philip of Greece and Denmark, in 1934 and again in 1937. They were second cousins once removed through King Christian IX of Denmark and third cousins through Queen Victoria. After meeting for the third time at the Royal Naval College in Dartmouth in July 1939, Elizabeth – though only 13 years old – said she fell in love with Philip, who was 18, and they began to exchange letters. She was 21 when their engagement was officially announced on 9 July 1947.

The engagement attracted some controversy. Philip had no financial standing, was foreign-born (though a British subject who had served in the Royal Navy throughout the Second World War), and his sisters had married German noblemen with Nazi links. Marion Crawford wrote, "Some of the King's advisors did not think him good enough for her. He was a prince without a home or kingdom. Some of the papers played long and loud tunes on the string of Philip's foreign origin." Later biographies reported that Elizabeth's mother had reservations about the union initially and teased Philip as "the Hun". In later life, however, she told the biographer Tim Heald that Philip was "an English gentleman".

Before the marriage, Philip renounced his Greek and Danish titles, and adopted the style Lieutenant Philip Mountbatten, taking the surname of his mother's British family. Shortly before the wedding, he was created Duke of Edinburgh and granted the style His Royal Highness. Elizabeth and Philip were married on 20 November 1947 at Westminster Abbey. They received 2,500 wedding gifts from around the world. Elizabeth required ration coupons to buy the material for her gown (which was designed by Norman Hartnell) because Britain had not yet completely recovered from the devastation of the war. In post-war Britain, it was not acceptable for Philip's German relations, including his three surviving sisters, to be invited to the wedding. Neither was an invitation extended to the Duke of Windsor, formerly King Edward VIII.

Elizabeth gave birth to her first child, Prince Charles, in November 1948. One month earlier, the King had issued letters patent allowing her children to use the style and title of a royal prince or princess, to which they otherwise would not have been entitled, as their father was no longer a royal prince. A second child, Princess Anne, was born in August 1950.

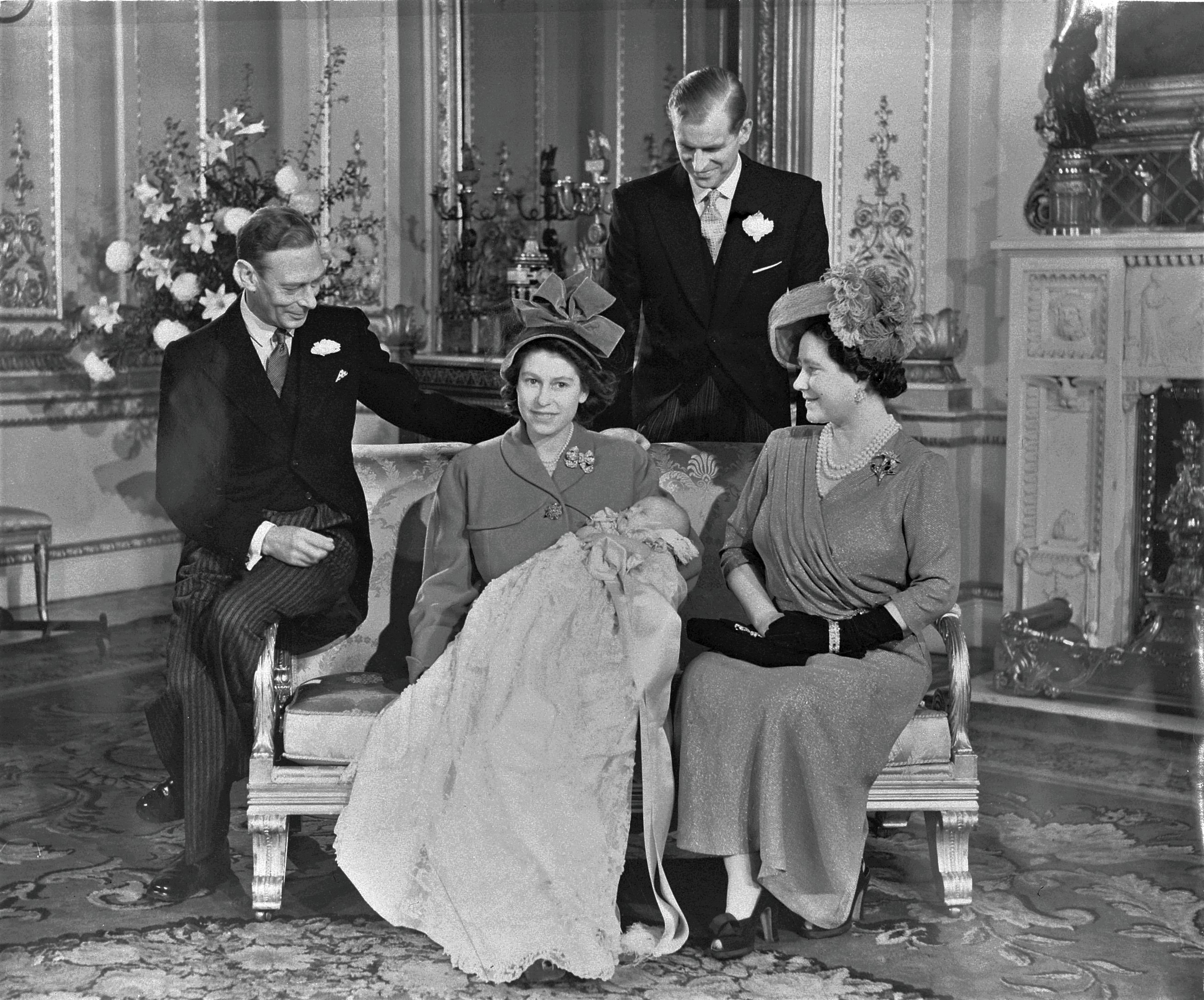
Family portrait with Charles after his christening ceremony, 1948

Following their wedding, the couple leased Windlesham Moor, near Windsor Castle, until July 1949, when they took up residence at Clarence House in London. At various times between 1949 and 1951, Philip was stationed in the British Crown Colony of Malta as a serving Royal Navy officer. He and Elizabeth lived intermittently in Malta for several months at a time in the hamlet of Gwardamanġa, at Villa Guardamangia, the rented home of Philip's uncle Lord Mountbatten. Their two children remained in Britain.

== Reign ==
=== Accession and coronation ===
As George VI's health declined during 1951, Elizabeth frequently stood in for him at public events. When she visited Canada and Harry S. Truman in Washington, DC, in October 1951, her private secretary Martin Charteris carried a draft accession declaration in case the King died while she was on tour. In early 1952, Elizabeth and Philip set out for a tour of Australia and New Zealand by way of the British colony of Kenya. On 6 February, they had just returned to their Kenyan home, Sagana Lodge, after a night spent at Treetops Hotel, when word arrived of the death of Elizabeth's father. Philip broke the news to the new queen. She chose to retain Elizabeth as her regnal name, and was therefore called Elizabeth II. The numeral offended some Scots, as she was the first Elizabeth to rule in Scotland. She was proclaimed queen throughout her realms, and the royal party hastily returned to the United Kingdom. Elizabeth and Philip moved into Buckingham Palace.

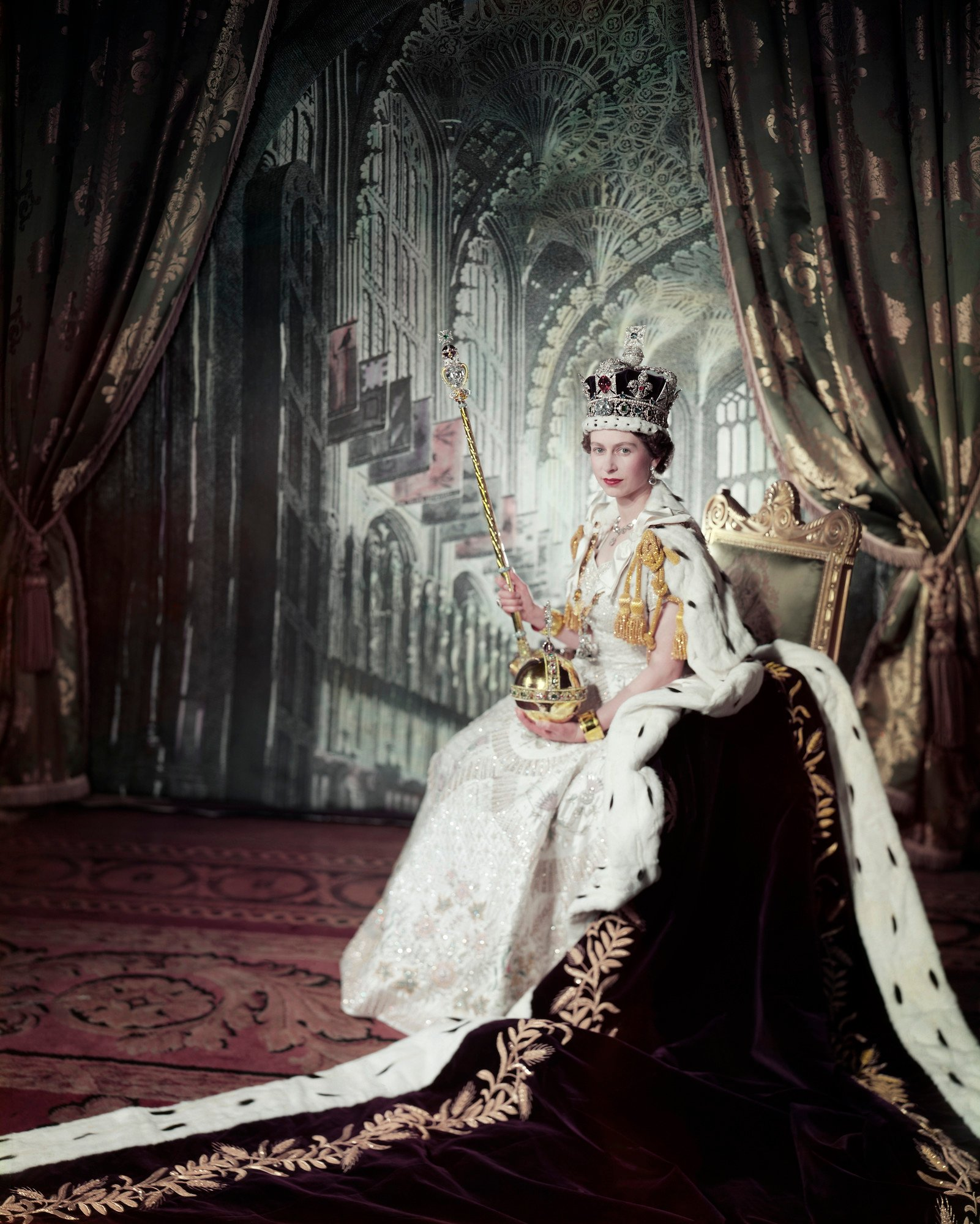
Coronation portrait by Cecil Beaton, 1953

With Elizabeth's accession, it seemed possible that the royal house would take her husband's name, in line with the custom for married women of the time. Lord Mountbatten advocated for House of Mountbatten, and Philip suggested House of Edinburgh, after his ducal title. The British prime minister, Winston Churchill, and Elizabeth's grandmother Queen Mary favoured the retention of the House of Windsor. Elizabeth issued a declaration on 9 April 1952 that the royal house would continue to be Windsor. Philip complained, "I am the only man in the country not allowed to give his name to his own children." In 1960, the surname Mountbatten-Windsor was adopted for Philip and Elizabeth's male-line descendants who do not carry royal titles.

Amid preparations for the coronation, Margaret told her sister she wished to marry Peter Townsend, a divorcé 16 years Margaret's senior with two sons from his previous marriage. Elizabeth asked them to wait for a year; in the words of her private secretary, "the Queen was naturally sympathetic towards the Princess, but I think she thought – she hoped – given time, the affair would peter out." Senior politicians were against the match and the Church of England did not permit remarriage after divorce. If Margaret had contracted a civil marriage, she would have been expected to renounce her right of succession. Margaret decided to abandon her plans with Townsend. In 1960, she married Antony Armstrong-Jones, who was created Earl of Snowdon the following year. They divorced in 1978; Margaret did not remarry.

Despite Queen Mary's death on 24 March 1953, the coronation went ahead on 2 June, as originally scheduled, as Mary had requested. The coronation ceremony in Westminster Abbey was televised for the first time, with the exception of the anointing and communion. (Note: Television coverage of the coronation was instrumental in boosting the medium's popularity; the number of television licences in the United Kingdom doubled to 3 million, and many of the more than 20 million British viewers watched television for the first time in the homes of their friends or neighbours. In North America, almost 100 million viewers watched recorded broadcasts.) On Elizabeth's instruction, her coronation gown was embroidered with the floral emblems of Commonwealth countries.

=== Early reign ===
Elizabeth's realms and their territories and protectorates at the beginning of her reign in 1952: United Kingdom Colonies, protectorates and mandates Dominions/realms

From Elizabeth's birth onwards, the British Empire continued its transformation into the Commonwealth of Nations. By the time of her accession in 1952, the monarch's role as head of multiple independent states was already established. In 1953, Elizabeth and Philip embarked on a seven-month round-the-world tour, visiting 13 countries and covering more than 40,000 miles (64,000 km) by land, sea and air. She became the first reigning monarch of Australia and New Zealand to visit those nations. During the tour, crowds were immense; three-quarters of the population of Australia were estimated to have seen her. Throughout her reign, she made hundreds of state visits to other countries and tours of the Commonwealth; she was the most widely travelled head of state.

During the run-up to the Suez Crisis in 1956, the British and French prime ministers, Sir Anthony Eden and Guy Mollet, secretly discussed the possibility of France joining the Commonwealth. But Mollet's proposal was not accepted, and the following year, France signed the Treaty of Rome, which established the European Economic Community, the precursor to the European Union. In November 1956, Britain and France invaded Egypt in an ultimately unsuccessful attempt to capture the Suez Canal. Lord Mountbatten said that Elizabeth was opposed to the invasion, though Eden denied it. Eden resigned two months later.

With Philip shaking hands with RAF officers at RAF Marham, 1956

The governing Conservative Party had no formal mechanism for choosing a leader, meaning that it fell to Elizabeth to decide whom to commission to form a government following Eden's resignation. Eden recommended she consult Lord Salisbury, the lord president of the council. Lord Salisbury and Lord Kilmuir, the lord chancellor, consulted the British Cabinet, Churchill, and the chairman of the backbench 1922 Committee, resulting in Elizabeth appointing their recommended candidate: Harold Macmillan.

The Suez crisis and the choice of Eden's successor led, in 1957, to the first major personal criticism of Elizabeth. In a magazine, which he owned and edited, Lord Altrincham accused her of being "out of touch". Altrincham was denounced by public figures and slapped by a member of the public appalled by his comments. Six years later, in 1963, Macmillan resigned and advised Elizabeth to appoint Alec Douglas-Home as the prime minister, advice she followed. Elizabeth again came under criticism for appointing the prime minister on the advice of a small number of ministers or a single minister. In 1965, the Conservatives adopted a formal mechanism for electing a leader, thus relieving Elizabeth of her involvement.

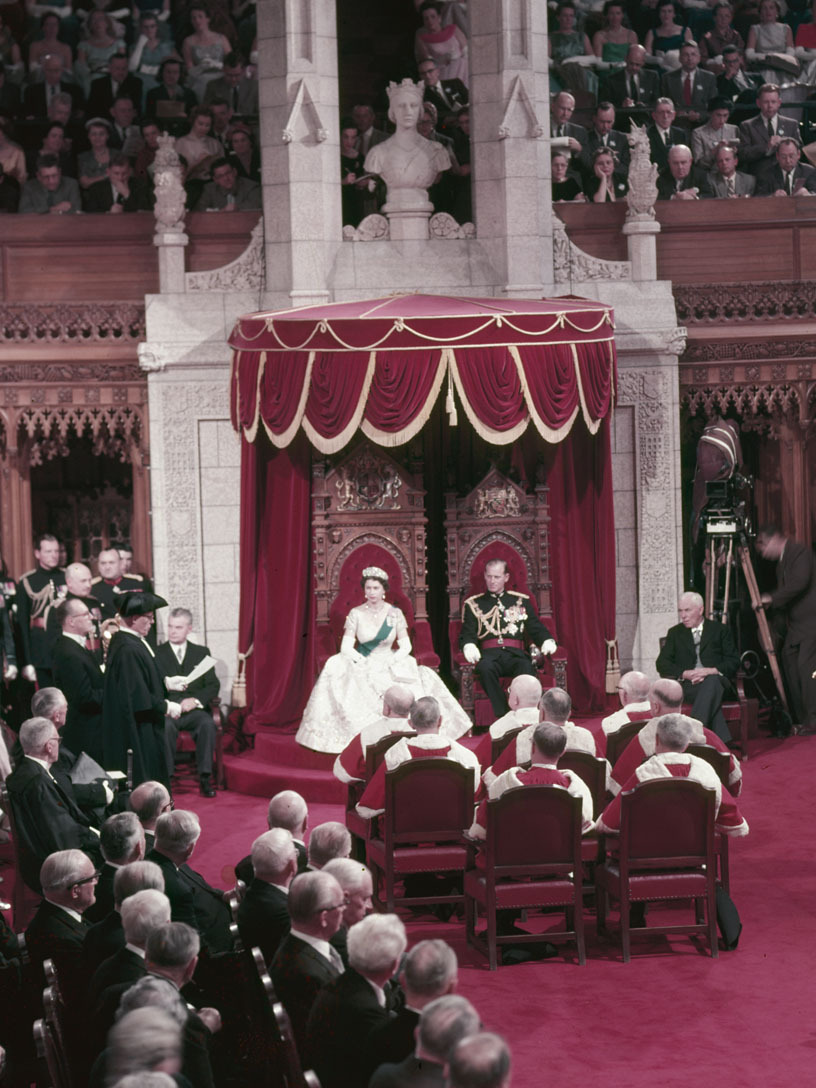
With Philip, seated on thrones at the Canadian parliament, 1957

In 1957, Elizabeth made a state visit to the United States, where she addressed the United Nations General Assembly on behalf of the Commonwealth. On the same tour, she opened the 23rd Canadian Parliament, becoming the first monarch of Canada to open a parliamentary session. Two years later, solely in her capacity as Queen of Canada, she revisited the United States and toured Canada. In 1961, she toured Cyprus, India, Pakistan, Nepal, and Iran. On a visit to Ghana the same year, she dismissed fears for her safety, even though her host, President Kwame Nkrumah, who had replaced her as head of state, was a target for assassins. Harold Macmillan wrote, "The Queen has been absolutely determined all through ... She is impatient of the attitude towards her to treat her as ... a film star ... She has indeed 'the heart and stomach of a man' ... She loves her duty and means to be a Queen." Before her tour through parts of Quebec in 1964, the press reported that extremists within the Quebec separatist movement were plotting Elizabeth's assassination. No assassination attempt was made, but a riot did break out while she was in Montreal; her "calmness and courage in the face of the violence" was noted.

Elizabeth gave birth to her third child, Andrew, in February 1960; this was the first birth to a reigning British monarch since 1857. Her fourth child, Prince Edward, was born in March 1964. According to biographer Gyles Brandreth, Elizabeth suffered a miscarriage at some point during her reign.

=== Political reforms and crises ===
The 1960s and 1970s saw an acceleration in the decolonisation of Africa and the Caribbean. More than 20 countries gained independence from Britain as part of a planned transition to self-government. In 1965, however, the Rhodesian prime minister, Ian Smith, in opposition to moves towards majority rule, unilaterally declared independence with Elizabeth as "Queen of Rhodesia". Although Elizabeth formally dismissed him, and the international community applied sanctions against Rhodesia, his regime survived for over a decade. As Britain's ties to its former empire weakened, the British government sought entry to the European Community, a goal it achieved in 1973.

With Philip laying a wreath for Aberfan disaster victims, 1966

In 1966, Elizabeth was criticised for waiting eight days before visiting the village of Aberfan, where a mining disaster killed 116 children and 28 adults. Martin Charteris said that the delay, made on his advice, was a mistake that she regretted later. Elizabeth toured Yugoslavia in October 1972, becoming the first British monarch to visit a communist country. She was received at the airport by President Josip Broz Tito, and a crowd of thousands greeted her in Belgrade.

In February 1974, British prime minister Edward Heath advised Elizabeth to call a general election in the middle of her tour of the Austronesian Pacific Rim, requiring her to fly back to Britain. The election resulted in a hung parliament; Heath's Conservatives were not the largest party but could stay in office if they formed a coalition with the Liberals. When discussions on forming a coalition foundered, Heath resigned, and Elizabeth asked the Leader of the Opposition, Labour's Harold Wilson, to form a government.

A year later, at the height of the 1975 Australian constitutional crisis, the Australian prime minister, Gough Whitlam, was dismissed from his post by Governor-General Sir John Kerr, after the Opposition-controlled Senate rejected Whitlam's budget proposals. As Whitlam had a majority in the House of Representatives, Speaker Gordon Scholes appealed to Elizabeth to reverse Kerr's decision. She declined, saying she would not interfere in decisions reserved by the Constitution of Australia for the governor-general. The crisis fuelled Australian republicanism.

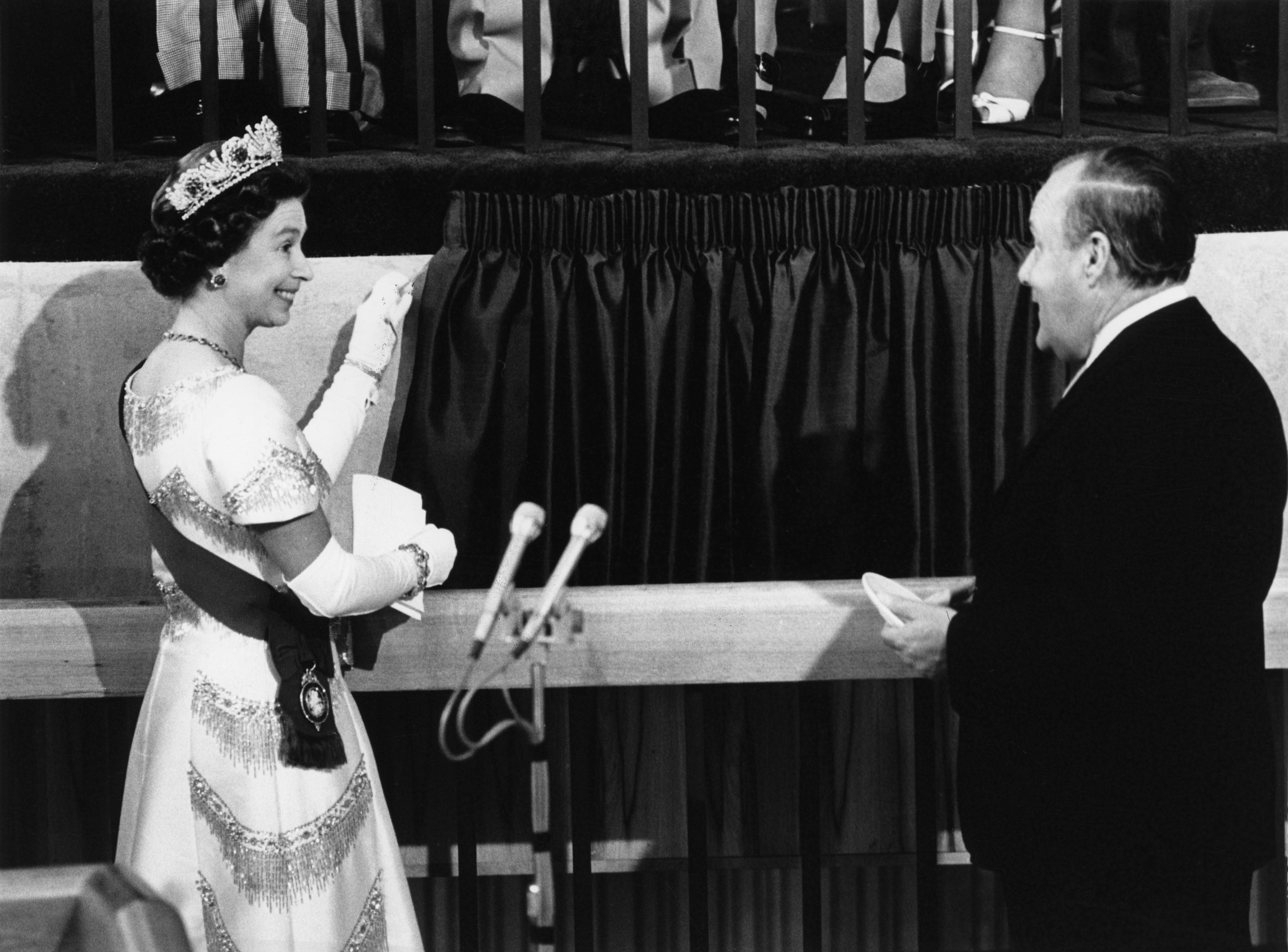
With Robert Muldoon during the state opening of New Zealand's parliament, one of several events held in 1977 to mark her Silver Jubilee

In 1977, Elizabeth marked the Silver Jubilee of her accession. Parties and events took place throughout the Commonwealth, many coinciding with her associated national and Commonwealth tours. The celebrations re-affirmed Elizabeth's popularity, despite virtually coincident negative press coverage of Margaret's separation from her husband, Lord Snowdon. In 1978, Elizabeth endured a state visit to the United Kingdom by Romania's communist leader, Nicolae Ceaușescu, and his wife, Elena, though privately she thought they had "blood on their hands". The following year brought two blows: the unmasking of Anthony Blunt, former Surveyor of the Queen's Pictures, as a communist spy and the assassination of Lord Mountbatten by the Provisional Irish Republican Army.

According to Paul Martin Sr., by the end of the 1970s, Elizabeth was worried the Crown "had little meaning for" Pierre Trudeau, the Canadian prime minister. Tony Benn said Elizabeth found Trudeau "rather disappointing". Trudeau's supposed republicanism seemed to be confirmed by his antics, such as sliding down banisters at Buckingham Palace and pirouetting behind Elizabeth's back in 1977, and the removal of various Canadian royal symbols during his term of office. In 1980, Canadian politicians sent to London to discuss the patriation of the Canadian constitution found Elizabeth "better informed ... than any of the British politicians or bureaucrats". She was particularly interested after the failure of Bill C-60, which would have affected her role as head of state.

=== Perils and dissent ===
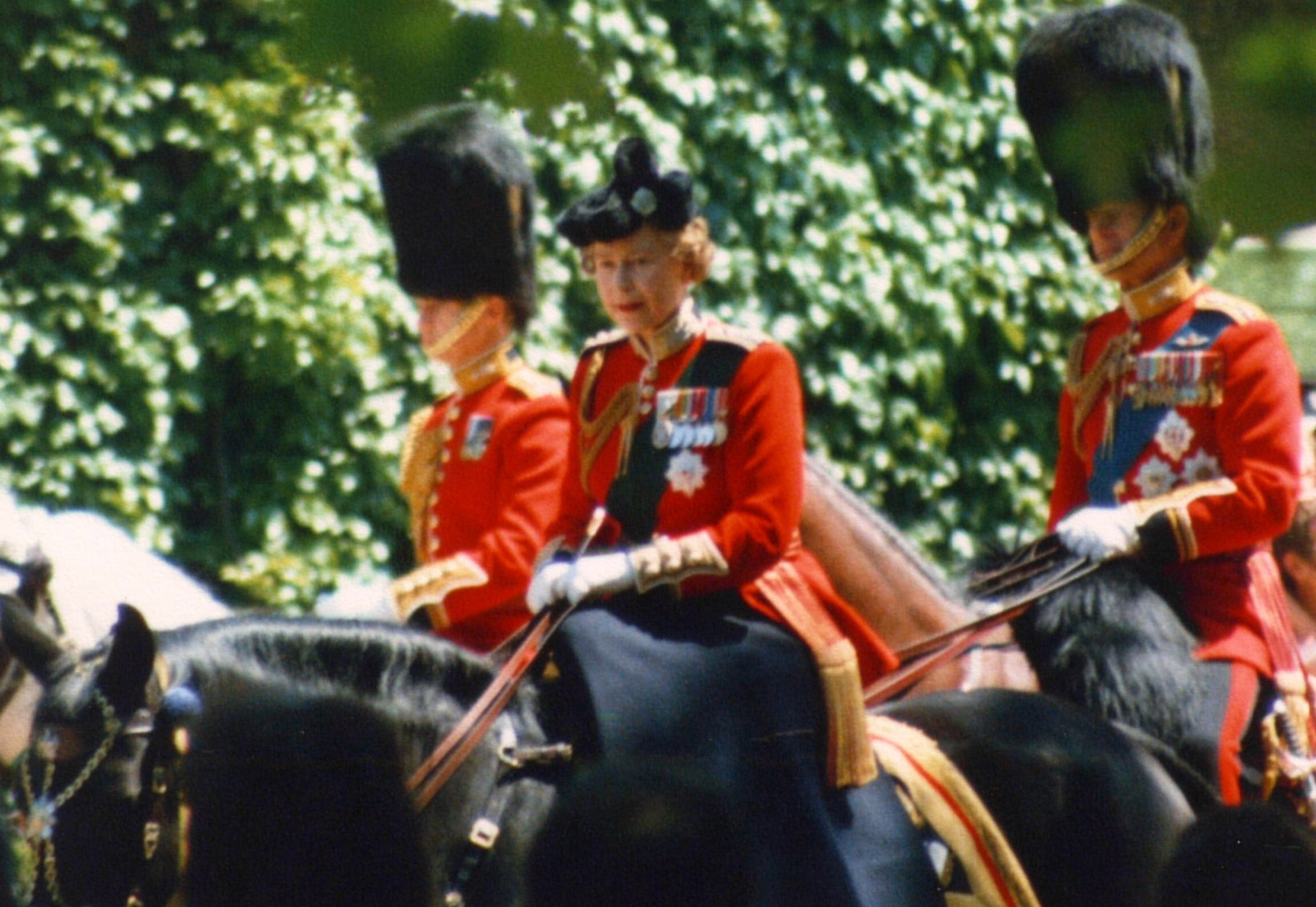
Riding Burmese at the 1986 Trooping the Colour ceremony

During the 1981 Trooping the Colour ceremony, six weeks before the wedding of Prince Charles and Lady Diana Spencer, six shots were fired at Elizabeth from close range as she rode down The Mall, London, on her horse, Burmese. Police later discovered the shots were blanks. The 17-year-old assailant, Marcus Sarjeant, was sentenced to five years in prison and released after three. Elizabeth's composure and skill in controlling her mount were widely praised. That October, Elizabeth was the subject of another attack while on a visit to Dunedin, New Zealand. Christopher John Lewis, who was 17 years old, fired a shot with a .22 rifle from the fifth floor of a building overlooking the parade but missed. Lewis was arrested, but instead of being charged with attempted murder or treason was sentenced to three years in jail for unlawful possession and discharge of a firearm. Two years into his sentence, he attempted to escape a psychiatric hospital with the intention of assassinating Charles, who was visiting the country with Diana and their son Prince William.

From April to September 1982, Elizabeth's son Andrew served with British forces in the Falklands War, for which she reportedly felt anxiety and pride. On 9 July, she awoke in her bedroom at Buckingham Palace to find an intruder, Michael Fagan, in the room with her. In a serious lapse of security, assistance only arrived after two calls to the Palace police switchboard. After hosting US president Ronald Reagan at Windsor Castle in 1982 and visiting his California ranch in 1983, Elizabeth was angered when his administration ordered the invasion of Grenada, one of her Caribbean realms, without informing her.

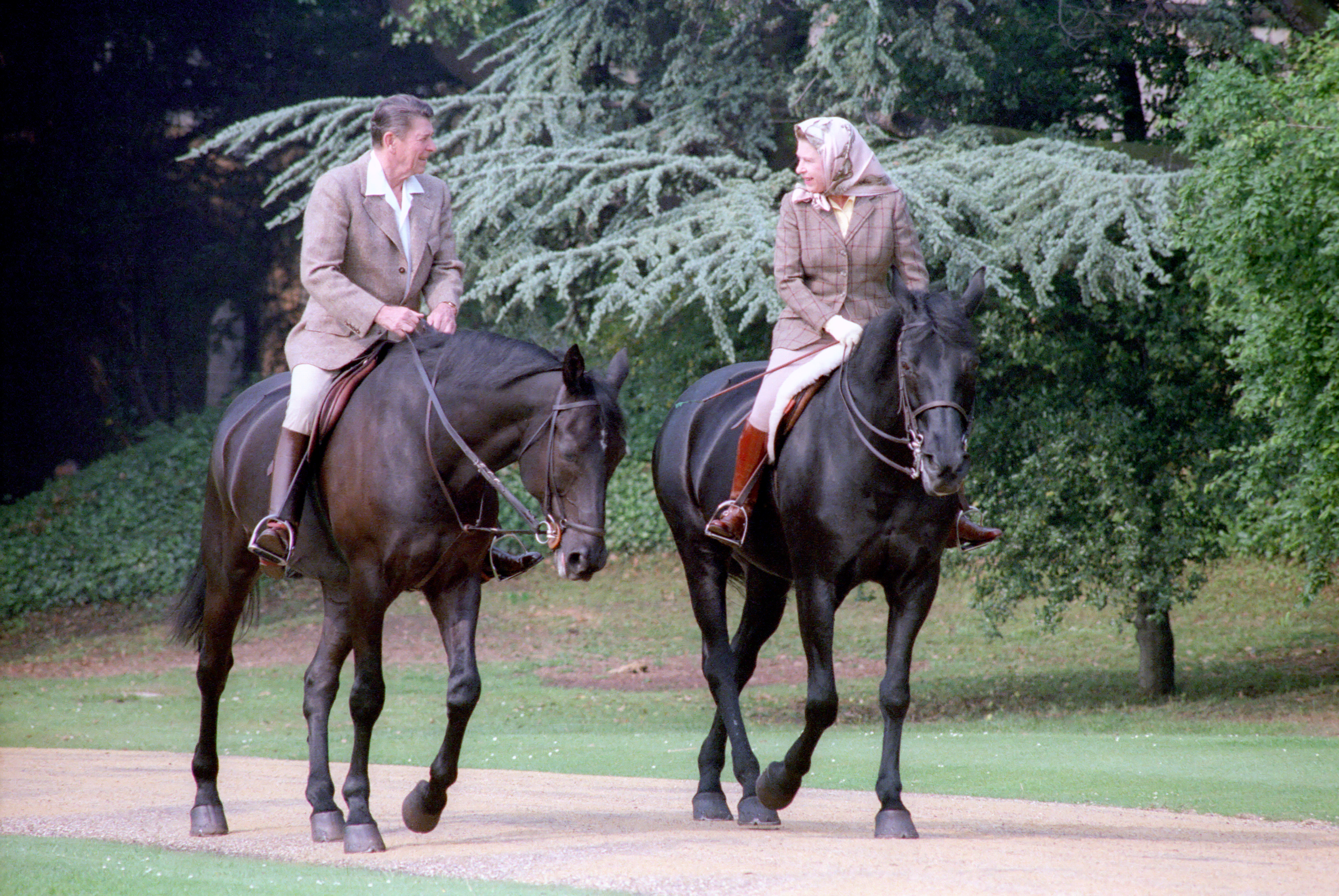
Riding at Windsor with Ronald Reagan, June 1982

Intense media interest in the opinions and private lives of the royal family during the 1980s led to a series of sensational stories in the press, pioneered by The Sun tabloid. As Kelvin MacKenzie, editor of The Sun, told his staff: "Give me a Sunday for Monday splash on the Royals. Don't worry if it's not true—so long as there's not too much of a fuss about it afterwards." Newspaper editor Donald Trelford wrote in The Observer of 21 September 1986: "The royal soap opera has now reached such a pitch of public interest that the boundary between fact and fiction has been lost sight of ... it is not just that some papers don't check their facts or accept denials: they don't care if the stories are true or not." It was reported, most notably in The Sunday Times of 20 July 1986, that Elizabeth was worried that Margaret Thatcher's economic policies fostered social divisions and was alarmed by high unemployment, a series of riots, the violence of a miners' strike, and Thatcher's refusal to apply sanctions against the apartheid regime in South Africa. The sources of the rumours included royal aide Michael Shea and Commonwealth secretary-general Shridath Ramphal, but Shea claimed his remarks were taken out of context and embellished by speculation. Thatcher reputedly said Elizabeth would vote for the Social Democratic Party – Thatcher's political opponents. Thatcher's biographer John Campbell claimed "the report was a piece of journalistic mischief-making". Reports of acrimony between them were exaggerated, and Elizabeth gave two honours in her personal gift – membership in the Order of Merit and the Order of the Garter – to Thatcher after her replacement as prime minister by John Major. Brian Mulroney, Canadian prime minister between 1984 and 1993, said Elizabeth was a "behind the scenes force" in ending apartheid.

In 1986, Elizabeth paid a six-day state visit to the People's Republic of China, becoming the first British monarch to visit the country. The tour included the Forbidden City, the Great Wall of China, and the Terracotta Warriors. At a state banquet, Elizabeth joked about the first British emissary to China being lost at sea with Queen Elizabeth I's letter to the Wanli Emperor, and remarked, "fortunately postal services have improved since 1602". Elizabeth's visit also signified the acceptance of both countries that sovereignty over Hong Kong would be transferred from the United Kingdom to China in 1997.

By the end of the 1980s, Elizabeth had become the target of satire. The involvement of younger members of the royal family in the charity game show It's a Royal Knockout in 1987 was ridiculed. In Canada, Elizabeth publicly supported politically divisive constitutional amendments, prompting criticism from opponents of the proposed changes, including Pierre Trudeau. The same year, the elected Fijian government was deposed in a military coup. As monarch of Fiji, Elizabeth supported the attempts of Governor-General Ratu Sir Penaia Ganilau to assert executive power and negotiate a settlement. Coup leader Sitiveni Rabuka deposed Ganilau and declared Fiji a republic.

=== Turbulent years ===
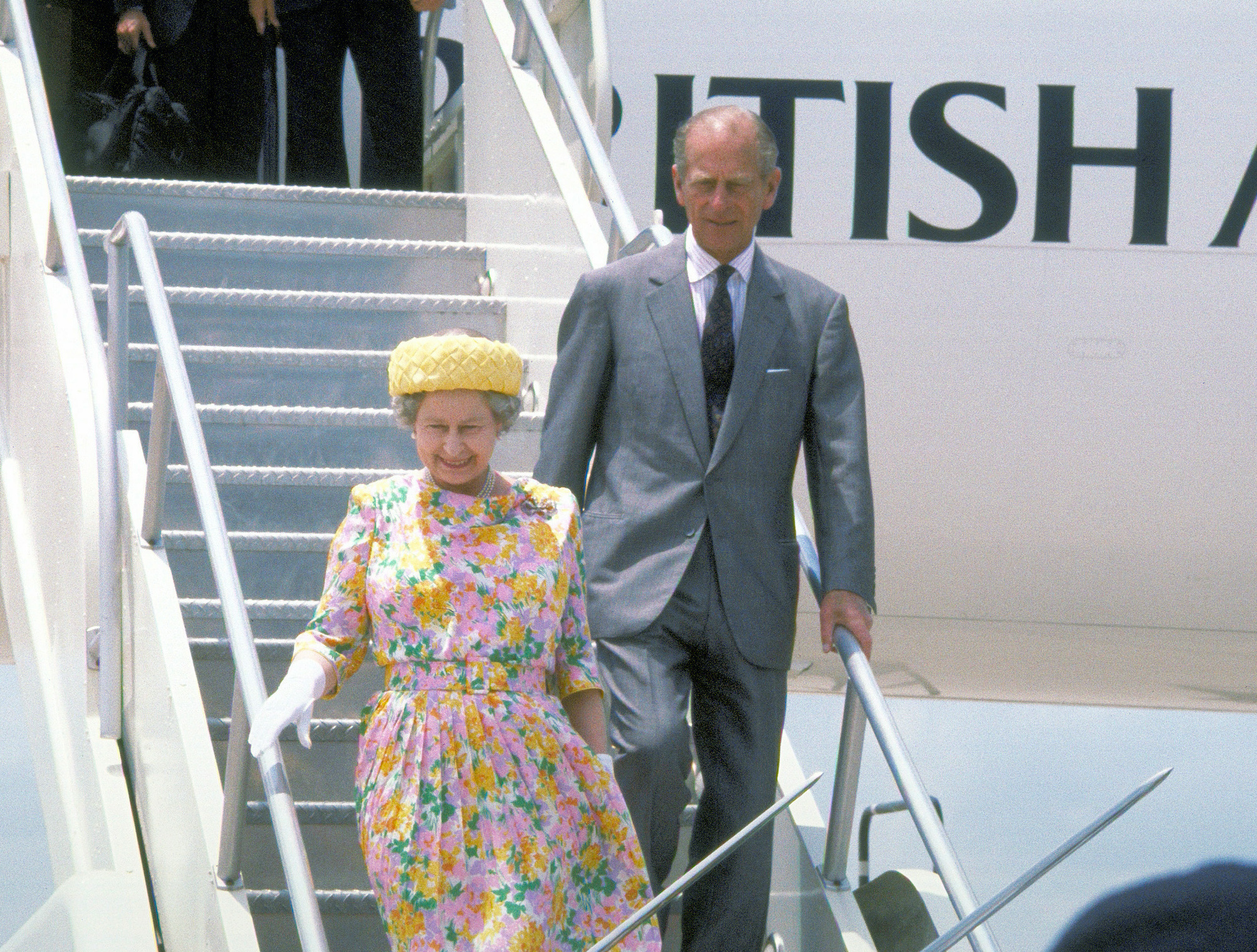
With Philip in the United States, May 1991

In the wake of coalition victory in the Gulf War, Elizabeth became the first British monarch to address a joint meeting of the United States Congress in May 1991. In November 1992, in a speech to mark the Ruby Jubilee of her accession, Elizabeth called 1992 her annus horribilis (a Latin phrase, meaning 'horrible year'). Republican feeling in Britain had risen because of press estimates of Elizabeth's private wealth – contradicted by the Palace (Note: The Sunday Times Rich List 1989 put her number one on the list with a reported wealth of £5.2 billion (approximately £13.1 billion in 2024's value), but it included state assets like the Royal Collection that were not hers personally. In 1993, Buckingham Palace called estimates of £100 million "grossly overstated". In 1971, Jock Colville, her former private secretary and a director of her bank, Coutts, estimated her wealth at £2 million (equivalent to about £15 million in 1993).) – and reports of affairs and strained marriages among her extended family. In March, her second son, Andrew, separated from his wife, Sarah; her daughter, Anne, divorced Captain Mark Phillips in April; angry demonstrators in Dresden threw eggs at Elizabeth during a state visit to Germany in October; and a large fire broke out at Windsor Castle, one of her official residences, in November. The monarchy came under increased criticism and public scrutiny. In an unusually personal speech, Elizabeth said that any institution must expect criticism, but suggested it might be done with "a touch of humour, gentleness and understanding". Two days later, John Major announced plans to reform the royal finances, drawn up the previous year, including Elizabeth paying income tax from 1993 onwards, and a reduction in the civil list. In December, Charles and his wife, Diana, formally separated. At the end of the year, Elizabeth sued The Sun newspaper for breach of copyright when it published the text of her annual Christmas message two days before it was broadcast. The newspaper was forced to pay her legal fees and donated £200,000 to charity. Elizabeth's solicitors had taken successful action against The Sun five years earlier for breach of copyright after it published a photograph of her daughter-in-law the Duchess of York and her granddaughter Princess Beatrice.

In January 1994, Elizabeth broke her left wrist when a horse she was riding at Sandringham tripped and fell. In October 1994, she became the first reigning British monarch to set foot on Russian soil. (Note: The only previous state visit by a British monarch to Russia was made by King Edward VII in 1908. The King never stepped ashore, and met Nicholas II on royal yachts off the Baltic port of what is now Tallinn, Estonia. During the four-day visit, which was considered to be one of the most important foreign trips of Elizabeth's reign, she and Philip attended events in Moscow and Saint Petersburg.) In October 1995, she was tricked into a hoax call by Montreal radio host Pierre Brassard impersonating Canadian prime minister Jean Chrétien. Elizabeth, who believed that she was speaking to Chrétien, said she supported Canadian unity and would try to influence Quebec's referendum on proposals to break away from Canada.

In the year that followed, public revelations on the state of Charles and Diana's marriage continued. In consultation with her husband and John Major, as well as the Archbishop of Canterbury (George Carey) and her private secretary (Robert Fellowes), Elizabeth wrote to Charles and Diana at the end of December 1995, suggesting that a divorce would be advisable.

In May 1996, a royal visit by Elizabeth to Aberystwyth, Wales, had to be cut short due to protests by the Welsh Language Society and students from the University College of Wales. Some demonstrators climbed over police barriers and broke through a police cordon in an attempt to block the route of her motorcade, while others held signs reading "Go Home Lizzie". After opening a new extension to the National Library of Wales, a planned visit to the university was cancelled on the advice of her protection officer and the local assistant chief constable. The demonstrators demanded that Elizabeth apologise to the Welsh, as she had the previous year to the Māori people for historic cultural genocide, and that a person with a closer connection to Wales open the library extension. This was the only time she had to cancel an engagement in the United Kingdom on security grounds.

In August 1997, a year after the divorce, Diana was killed in a car crash in Paris. Elizabeth was on holiday with her extended family at Balmoral. Diana's two sons, William and Harry, wanted to attend church, so Elizabeth and Philip took them that morning. Afterwards, for five days, the royal couple shielded their grandsons from the intense press interest by keeping them at Balmoral where they could grieve in private, but the royal family's silence and seclusion, and the failure to fly a flag at half-mast over Buckingham Palace, caused public dismay. Pressured by the hostile reaction, Elizabeth agreed to return to London and address the nation in a live television broadcast on 5 September, the day before Diana's funeral. In the broadcast, she expressed admiration for Diana and her feelings "as a grandmother" for the two princes. As a result, much of the public hostility evaporated.

In October 1997, Elizabeth and Philip made a state visit to India, which included a controversial visit to the site of the Jallianwala Bagh massacre to pay her respects. Protesters chanted "Killer Queen, go back", and there were demands for her to apologise for the action of British troops 78 years earlier. At the memorial in the park, she and Philip laid a wreath and stood for a 30‑second moment of silence. As a result, much of the fury among the public softened, and the protests were called off. Back in London that November, the royal couple held a reception at Banqueting House to mark their golden wedding anniversary. Elizabeth made a speech and praised Philip for his role as consort, referring to him as "my strength and stay".

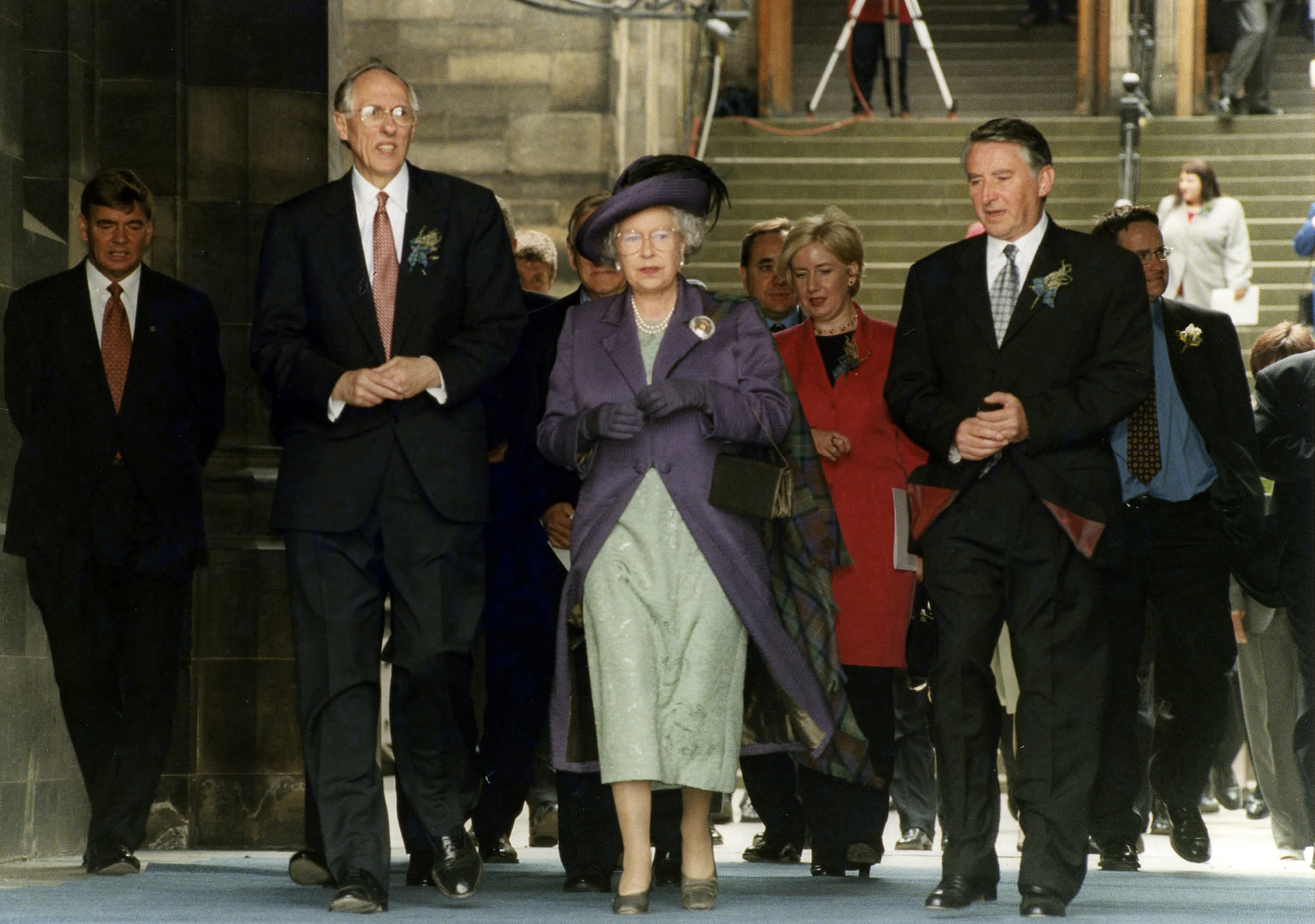
Making their way out of the Scottish Parliament Building during the opening of the Scottish Parliament, 1999

In 1999, as part of the process of devolution in the United Kingdom, Elizabeth formally opened newly established legislatures for Wales and Scotland: the National Assembly for Wales at Cardiff in May, and the Scottish Parliament at Edinburgh in July.

=== Dawn of the new millennium ===
On the eve of the new millennium, Elizabeth and Philip boarded a vessel from Southwark, bound for the Millennium Dome. Before passing under Tower Bridge, she lit the National Millennium Beacon in the Pool of London using a laser torch. Shortly before midnight, she officially opened the Dome. During the singing of Auld Lang Syne, Elizabeth held hands with Philip and British prime minister Tony Blair. Following the 9/11 attacks in the United States, Elizabeth, breaking with tradition, ordered the American national anthem to be played during the changing of the guard at Buckingham Palace to express her solidarity with the country.

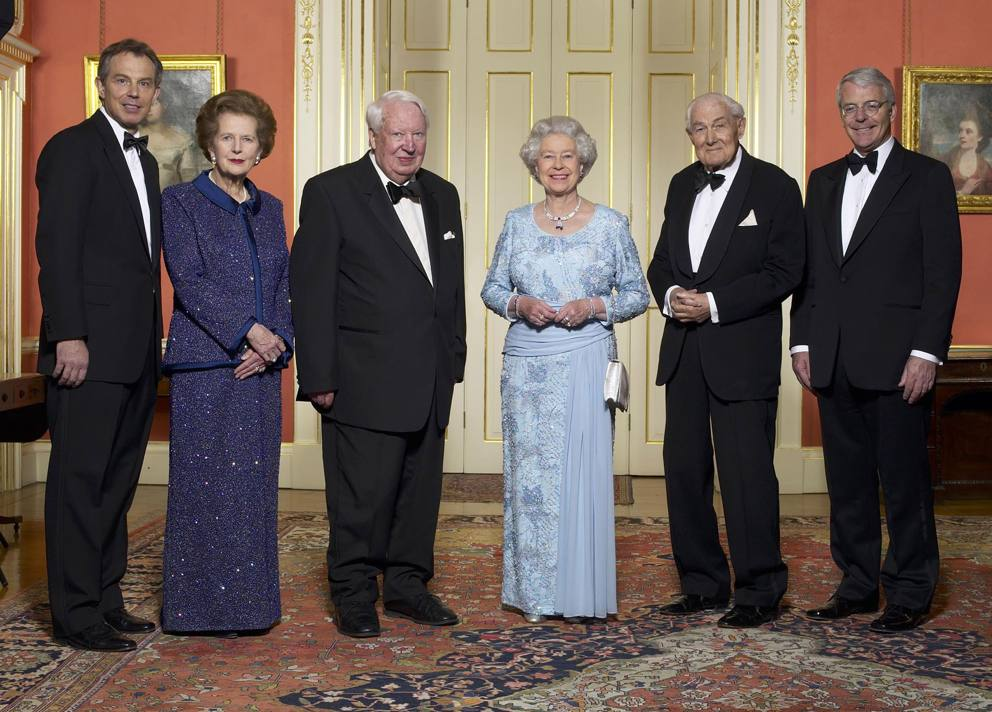
With living British prime ministers during a Golden Jubilee dinner, 2002

In 2002, Elizabeth marked her Golden Jubilee, the 50th anniversary of her accession. Her sister died in February and her mother in March, and the media speculated on whether the Jubilee would be a success or a failure. Margaret's death shook Elizabeth; her funeral was one of the rare occasions where Elizabeth openly cried. Elizabeth again undertook an extensive tour of her realms, beginning in Jamaica in February, where she called the farewell banquet "memorable" after a power cut plunged King's House, the official residence of the governor-general, into darkness. As in 1977, there were street parties and commemorative events, and monuments were named to honour the occasion. One million people attended each day of the three-day main Jubilee celebration in London, and the enthusiasm shown for Elizabeth by the public was greater than many journalists had anticipated.

In 2003, Elizabeth sued the Daily Mirror for breach of confidence and obtained an injunction which prevented the outlet from publishing information gathered by a reporter who posed as a footman at Buckingham Palace. The newspaper also paid £25,000 towards her legal costs. Though generally healthy throughout her life, in 2003 she had keyhole surgery on both knees. In October 2006, she missed the opening of the new Emirates Stadium because of a strained back muscle that had been troubling her since the summer.

In May 2007, citing unnamed sources, The Daily Telegraph reported that Elizabeth was "exasperated and frustrated" by the policies of Tony Blair, that she was concerned the British Armed Forces were overstretched in Iraq and Afghanistan, and that she had raised concerns over rural and countryside issues with Blair. She was, however, said to admire Blair's efforts to achieve peace in Northern Ireland. She became the first British monarch to celebrate a diamond wedding anniversary in November 2007. On 20 March 2008, at the Church of Ireland St Patrick's Cathedral, Armagh, Elizabeth attended the first Maundy service held outside England and Wales.

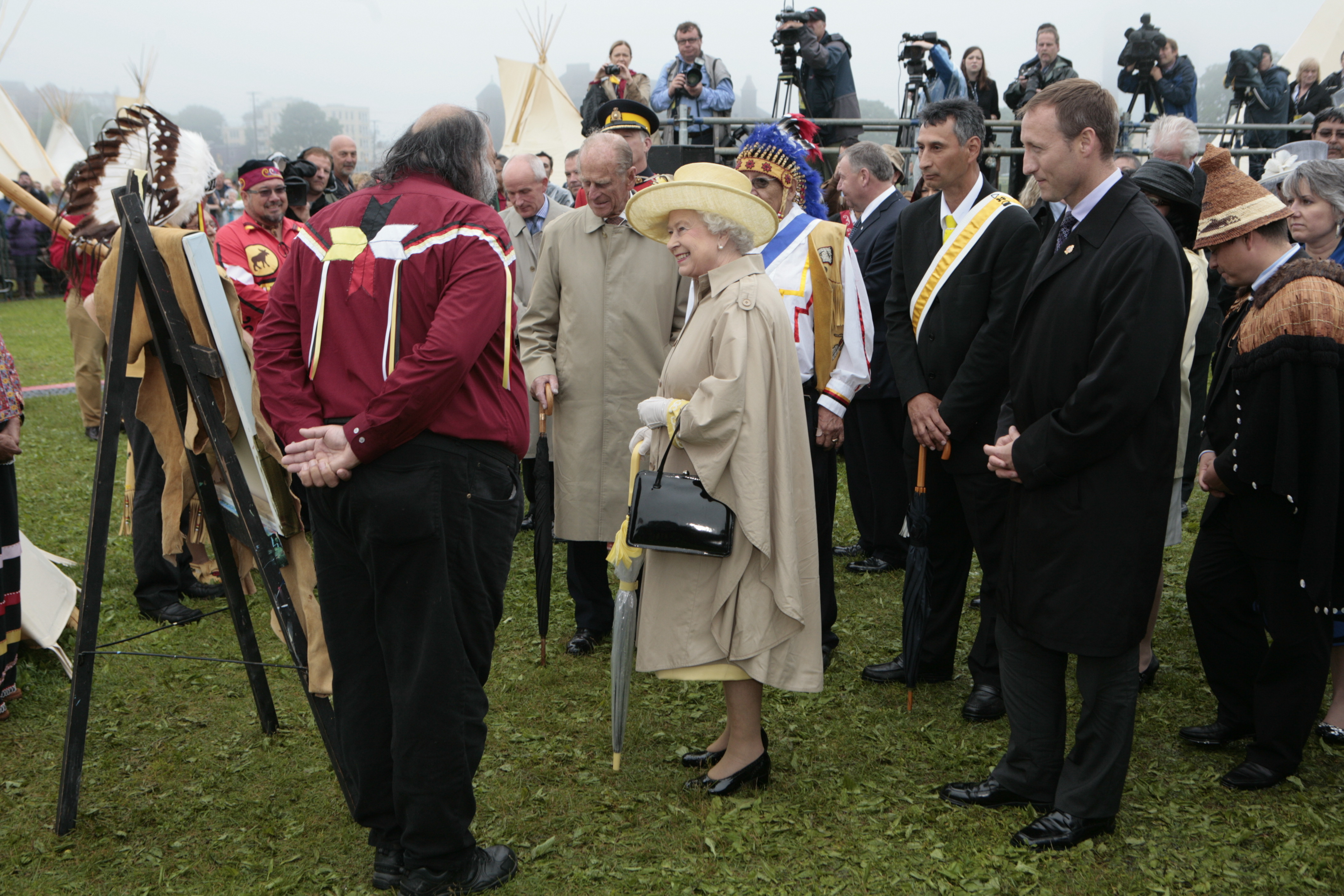
Presentation of a Henri Membertou portrait during her 2010 Canadian tour

Elizabeth addressed the UN General Assembly for a second time in 2010, again in her capacity as Queen of all Commonwealth realms and Head of the Commonwealth. The UN secretary-general, Ban Ki-moon, introduced her as "an anchor for our age". During her visit to New York, which followed a tour of Canada, she officially opened a memorial garden for British victims of the 9/11 attacks. Elizabeth's 11-day visit to Australia in October 2011 was her 16th visit to the country since 1954. By invitation of the Irish president, Mary McAleese, she made the first state visit to the Republic of Ireland by a British monarch in May 2011.

=== Diamond Jubilee and milestones ===
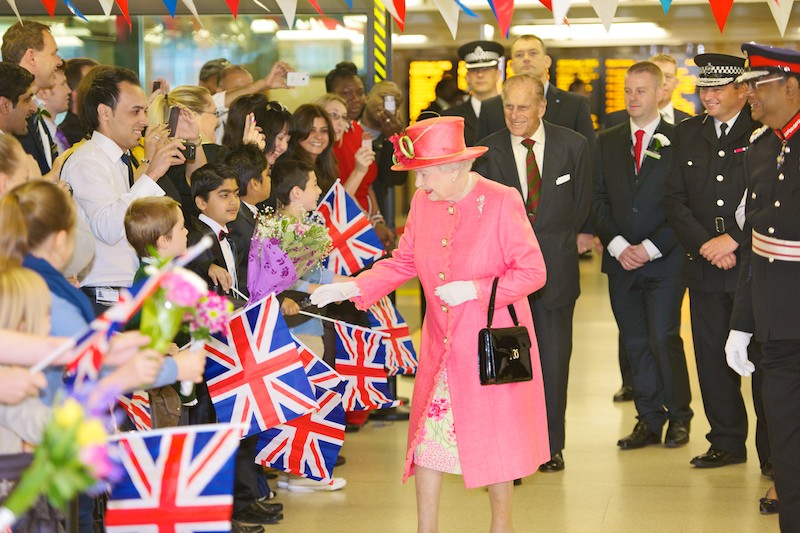
Visiting Birmingham in July 2012 as part of the Diamond Jubilee tour

The 2012 Diamond Jubilee marked 60 years since Elizabeth's accession, and celebrations were held throughout her realms, the wider Commonwealth, and beyond. She and Philip undertook an extensive tour of the United Kingdom, while their children and grandchildren embarked on royal tours of other Commonwealth states on her behalf. On 4 June, Jubilee beacons were lit around the world. On 18 December, Elizabeth became the first British sovereign to attend a peacetime Cabinet meeting since George III in 1781.

Elizabeth, who opened the Montreal Summer Olympics in 1976, also opened the 2012 Summer Olympics and Paralympics in London, making her the first head of state to open two Olympic Games in two countries. For the London Olympics, she portrayed herself in a short film as part of the opening ceremony, alongside Daniel Craig as James Bond. On 4 April 2013, she received an honorary BAFTA award for her patronage of the film industry and was called "the most memorable Bond girl yet" at a special presentation at Windsor Castle.

In March 2013, Elizabeth stayed overnight at King Edward VII's Hospital as a precaution after developing symptoms of gastroenteritis. A week later, she signed the new Charter of the Commonwealth. That year, because of her age and the need for her to limit travelling, she chose not to attend the biennial Commonwealth Heads of Government Meeting for the first time in 40 years. She was represented at the summit in Sri Lanka by Charles. On 20 April 2018, the Commonwealth heads of government announced that Charles would succeed her as Head of the Commonwealth, which the Queen stated as her "sincere wish". She underwent cataract surgery in May 2018. In March 2019, she gave up driving on public roads, largely as a consequence of a car accident involving her husband two months earlier.

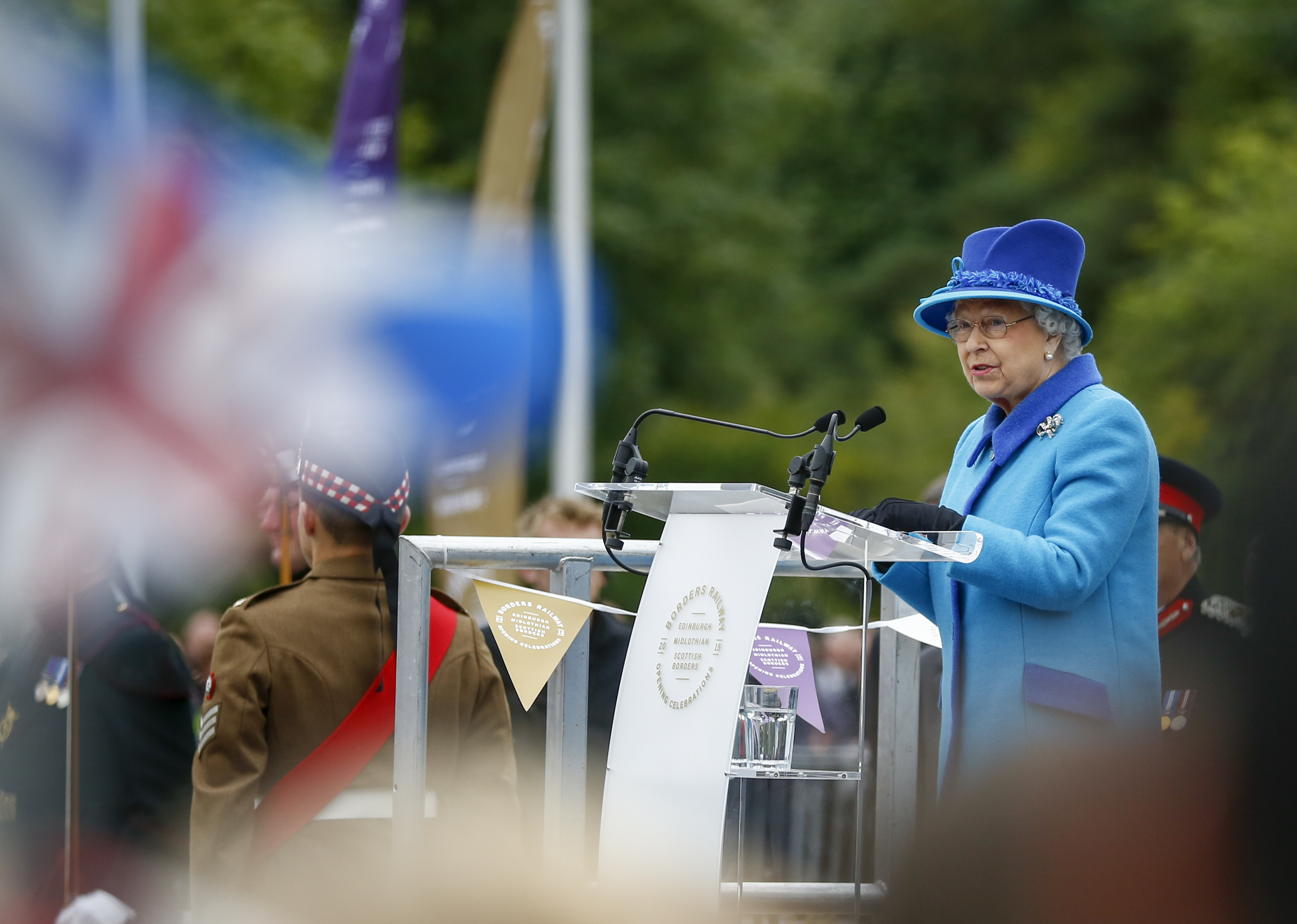
Opening the Borders Railway on the day she became the longest-reigning British monarch, 2015. In her speech, she said she had never aspired to achieve that milestone.

On 21 December 2007, Elizabeth surpassed her great-great-grandmother, Queen Victoria, to become the longest-lived British monarch, and she became the longest-reigning British monarch and longest-reigning queen regnant and female head of state in the world on 9 September 2015. She became the oldest living monarch after the death of King Abdullah of Saudi Arabia on 23 January 2015. She later became the longest-reigning current monarch and the longest-serving current head of state following the death of King Bhumibol Adulyadej of Thailand on 13 October 2016, and the oldest current head of state on the resignation of Robert Mugabe of Zimbabwe on 21 November 2017. On 6 February 2017, she became the first British monarch to commemorate a sapphire jubilee, and on 20 November that year, she was the first British monarch to celebrate a platinum wedding anniversary. Philip had retired from his official duties as Elizabeth's consort in August 2017.

=== Pandemic and widowhood ===
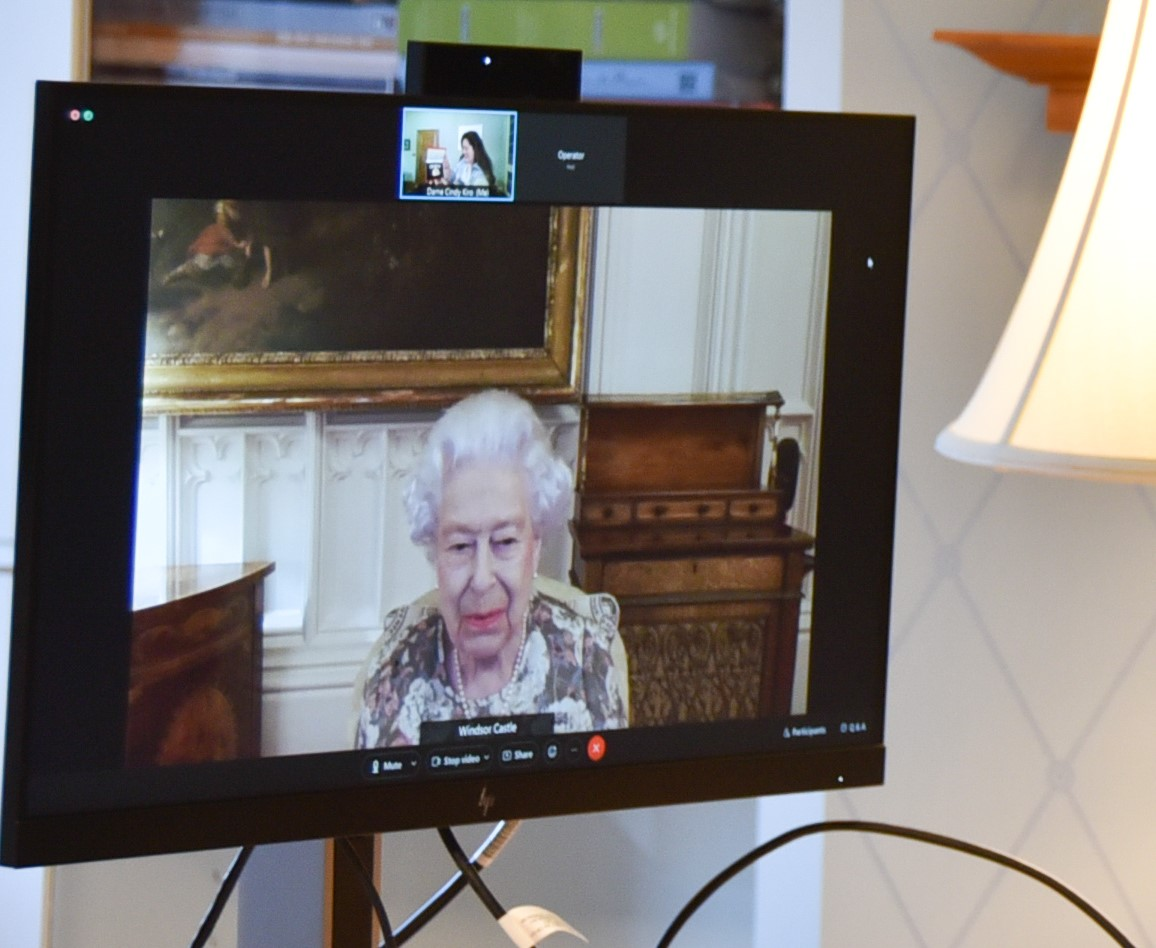
Virtual meeting with Cindy Kiro during the COVID-19 pandemic, October 2021

On 19 March 2020, as the COVID-19 pandemic hit the United Kingdom, Elizabeth moved to Windsor Castle and sequestered there as a precaution. Public engagements were cancelled and Windsor Castle followed a strict sanitary protocol nicknamed "HMS Bubble". On 5 April, in a televised broadcast watched by an estimated 24 million viewers in the United Kingdom, Elizabeth asked people to "take comfort that while we may have more still to endure, better days will return: we will be with our friends again; we will be with our families again; we will meet again." On 8 May, the 75th anniversary of VE Day, in a television broadcast at 9 pm—the exact time at which her father had broadcast to the nation on the same day in 1945—she asked people to "never give up, never despair". In 2021, she received her first and second COVID-19 vaccinations in January and April respectively.

Philip died on 9 April 2021, after 73 years of marriage, making Elizabeth the first British monarch to reign as a widow or widower since Queen Victoria. She was reportedly at her husband's bedside when he died, and remarked in private that his death had "left a huge void". Due to the COVID-19 restrictions in place in England at the time, Elizabeth sat alone at Philip's funeral service, which evoked sympathy from people around the world. It was later reported in the press that Elizabeth had rejected a government offer to relax the rules. In her Christmas broadcast that year, which was ultimately her last, she paid a personal tribute to her "beloved Philip", saying, "That mischievous, inquiring twinkle was as bright at the end as when I first set eyes on him."

With other G7 leaders during the 47th G7 summit in Cornwall, 2021

Despite the pandemic, Elizabeth attended the 2021 State Opening of Parliament in May, the 47th G7 summit in June, and hosted US president Joe Biden at Windsor Castle. Biden was the 14th US president that she had met. In October 2021, Elizabeth cancelled a planned trip to Northern Ireland and stayed overnight at King Edward VII's Hospital for "preliminary investigations". On Christmas Day 2021, while she was staying at Windsor Castle, 19-year-old Jaswant Singh Chail broke into the gardens using a rope ladder and carrying a crossbow with the aim of assassinating Elizabeth in revenge for the Amritsar massacre. Before he could enter any buildings, he was arrested and detained under the Mental Health Act. In February 2023, Chail pleaded guilty to attempting to injure or alarm the sovereign, and was sentenced in October to a nine-year custodial sentence plus an additional five years on extended licence. The sentencing judge also placed Chail under a hybrid order under section 45A of the Mental Health Act 1983, ordering that he remain at Broadmoor Hospital to be transferred into custody only after receiving psychiatric treatment.

=== Platinum Jubilee and beyond ===
Elizabeth's Platinum Jubilee celebrations began on 6 February 2022, marking 70 years since her accession. In her accession day message, she renewed her commitment to a lifetime of public service, which she had originally made in 1947. Later that month, she fell ill with COVID-19 along with several family members, but she only exhibited "mild cold-like symptoms" and recovered by the end of the month. She was present at the service of thanksgiving for her husband at Westminster Abbey on 29 March, but was unable to attend both the annual Commonwealth Day service that month and the Royal Maundy service in April, because of "episodic mobility problems". In May, she missed the State Opening of Parliament for the first time in 59 years. (She did not attend the state openings in 1959 and 1963 as she was pregnant with Andrew and Edward, respectively.) Later that month she made a surprise visit to Paddington Station and officially opened the Elizabeth line, named in her honour.

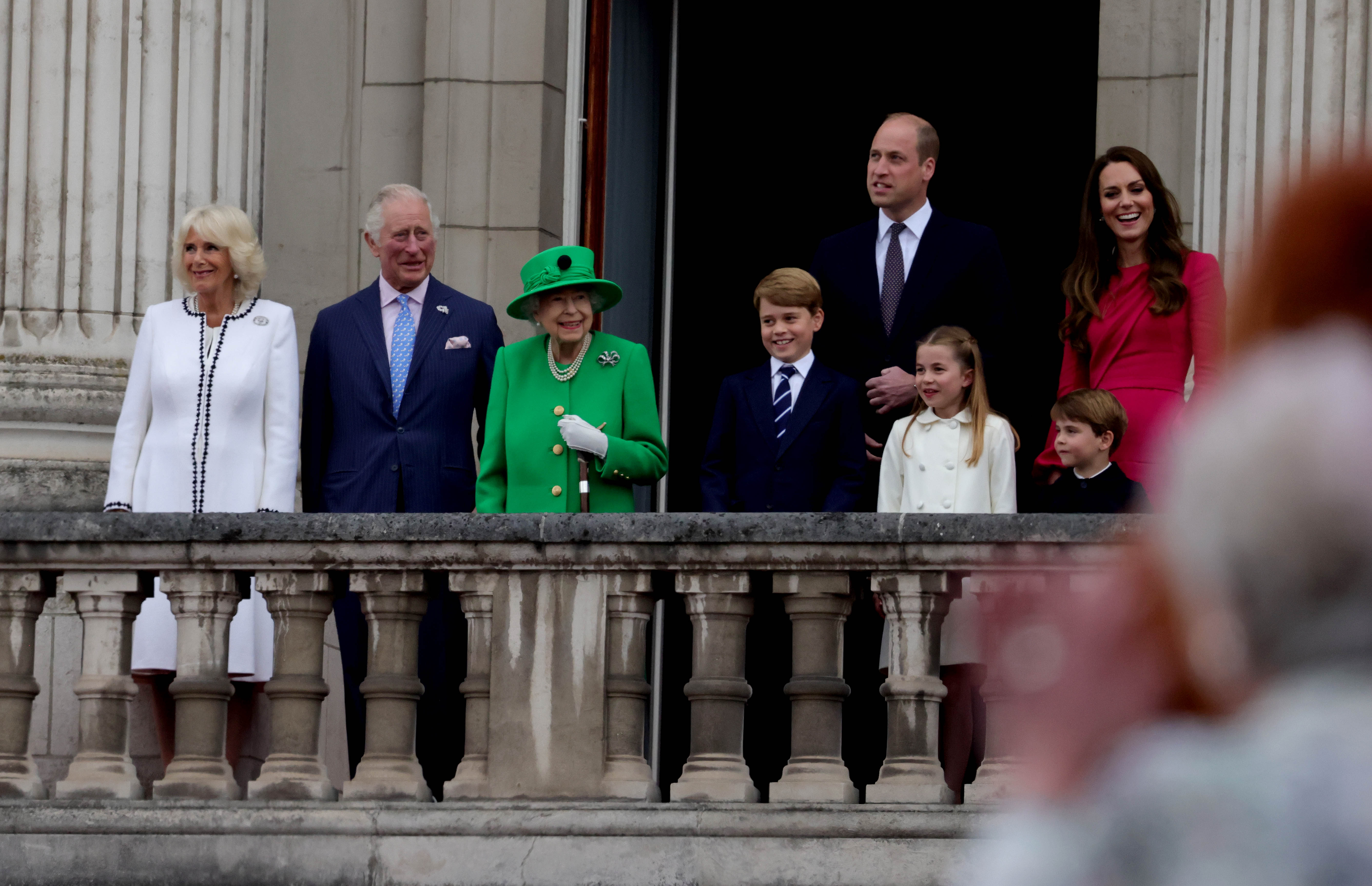
With the royal family on the balcony of Buckingham Palace following the Platinum Jubilee Pageant, June 2022

Elizabeth was largely confined to balcony appearances during the public jubilee celebrations, and she missed the National Service of Thanksgiving on 3 June. On 13 June, she became the second-longest reigning monarch in history (among those whose exact dates of reign are known), with 70 years and 127 days on the throne – surpassing King Bhumibol Adulyadej of Thailand. On 6 September, she appointed her 15th British prime minister, Liz Truss, at Balmoral Castle in Scotland. This was the only occasion on which Elizabeth received a new prime minister at a location other than Buckingham Palace. No other British monarch appointed as many prime ministers. Elizabeth's last public message was issued on 7 September, in which she expressed her sympathy for those affected by the Saskatchewan stabbings.

Elizabeth did not plan to abdicate, though she took on fewer public engagements in her later years and Charles performed more of her duties. She told Canadian governor-general Adrienne Clarkson in a meeting in 2002 that she would never abdicate, saying, "It is not our tradition. Although, I suppose if I became completely gaga, one would have to do something." In June 2022, Elizabeth met the Archbishop of Canterbury, Justin Welby, who "came away thinking there is someone who has no fear of death, has hope in the future, knows the rock on which she stands and that gives her strength."

== Death ==
Elizabeth's coffin being loaded into a hearse outside the Palace of Holyroodhouse, 2022

On 8 September 2022, Buckingham Palace stated, "Following further evaluation this morning, the Queen's doctors are concerned for Her Majesty's health and have recommended she remain under medical supervision. The Queen remains comfortable and at Balmoral." Her immediate family rushed to Balmoral. Elizabeth died peacefully at 3:10 pm, aged 96. Her death was announced to the public at 6:30 pm, setting in motion Operation London Bridge and, because she died in Scotland, Operation Unicorn. Elizabeth was the first monarch to die in Scotland since James V in 1542. Her death certificate recorded her cause of death as "old age". According to former prime minister Boris Johnson and the biographer Gyles Brandreth, she was suffering from a form of bone marrow cancer, which Brandreth wrote was multiple myeloma.

On 12 September, Elizabeth's coffin was carried up the Royal Mile in a procession to St Giles' Cathedral, where the Crown of Scotland was placed on it. Her coffin lay at rest at the cathedral for 24 hours, guarded by the Royal Company of Archers, during which around 33,000 people filed past it. On 13 September, the coffin was flown to RAF Northolt in west London, before continuing its journey by road to Buckingham Palace. On 14 September, her coffin was taken in a military procession to Westminster Hall, where Elizabeth's body lay in state for four days. The coffin was guarded by members of both the Sovereign's Bodyguard and the Household Division. An estimated 250,000 members of the public filed past the coffin, as did politicians and other public figures. On 16 September, Elizabeth's children held a vigil around her coffin, and the next day her eight grandchildren did the same.

Elizabeth lying in state at Westminster Hall, 2022

Elizabeth's state funeral was held at Westminster Abbey on 19 September, marking the first time a monarch's funeral service had been held there since that of George II in 1760. More than a million people lined the streets of central London, and the day was declared a holiday in several Commonwealth countries. In Windsor, a final procession involving 1,000 military personnel took place and was witnessed by 97,000 people. Elizabeth's fell pony and two royal corgis stood at the side of the procession. After a committal service at St George's Chapel, Windsor Castle, Elizabeth's body was interred with her husband Philip's in the King George VI Memorial Chapel later the same day, in a private ceremony attended by her closest family members.

== Public image ==
=== Beliefs, activities, and interests ===
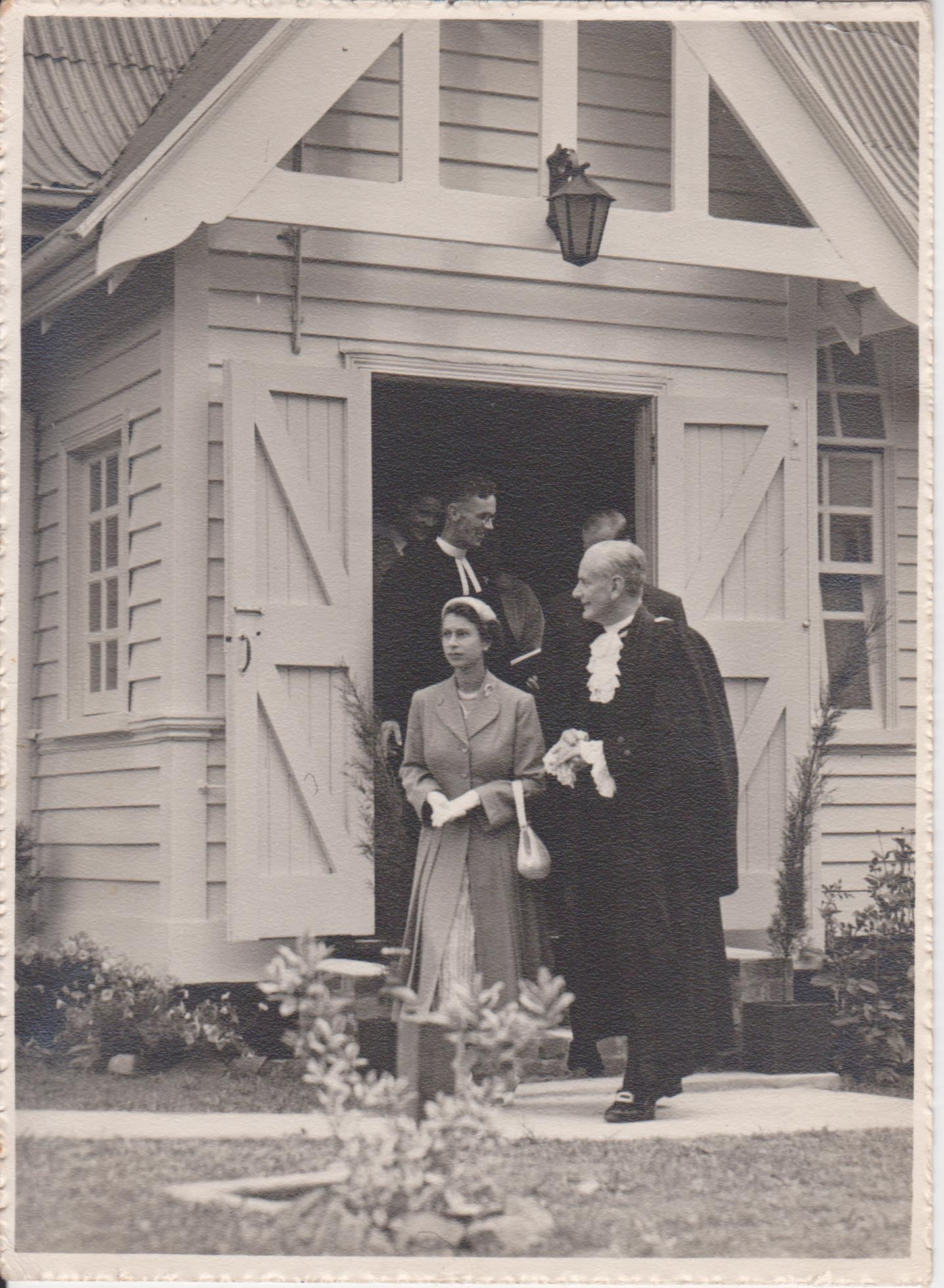
With the moderator of the Presbyterian Church of Victoria after service, 1954

Elizabeth had a deep sense of religious and civic duty, and took her Coronation Oath seriously. Aside from her official religious role as supreme governor of the established Church of England, she worshipped with that church and with the national Church of Scotland. She demonstrated support for inter-faith relations and met with leaders of other churches and religions, including five popes: Pius XII, John XXIII, John Paul II, Benedict XVI and Francis. A personal note about her faith often featured in her annual Christmas Message broadcast to the Commonwealth. In 2000, she said:

To many of us, our beliefs are of fundamental importance. For me the teachings of Christ and my own personal accountability before God provide a framework in which I try to lead my life. I, like so many of you, have drawn great comfort in difficult times from Christ's words and example.

Elizabeth rarely gave interviews, and little was known of her political opinions, which she did not express explicitly in public. By convention, the monarch’s political views are neither asked about nor publicly disclosed. When Times journalist Paul Routledge asked her about the miners' strike of 1984–85 during a royal tour of the newspaper's offices, she replied that it was "all about one man" (a reference to Arthur Scargill), with which Routledge disagreed. Routledge was widely criticised in the media for asking the question and claimed that he was unaware of the protocols. After the 2014 Scottish independence referendum, Prime Minister David Cameron was overheard telling Mayor of New York City Michael Bloomberg that Elizabeth was pleased with the outcome, an incident for which Cameron later apologised. She had arguably issued a public coded statement about the referendum by telling one woman outside Balmoral Kirk that she hoped people would think "very carefully" about the outcome. It emerged later that Cameron had specifically requested that she register her concern.

A statue of Elizabeth in Oakham, erected in 2024 with three royal corgis at her feet and around the base.

Elizabeth was patron of more than 600 organisations and charities. The Charities Aid Foundation estimated that Elizabeth helped raise over £1.4 billion for her patronages during her reign. Her main leisure interests included equestrianism and dogs, especially her Pembroke Welsh Corgis. Her lifelong love of corgis began in 1933 with Dookie, the first of many royal corgis. Scenes of a relaxed, informal home life were occasionally witnessed; she and her family, from time to time, prepared a meal together and washed the dishes afterwards.

=== Media depiction and public opinion ===
In the 1950s, as a young woman at the start of her reign, Elizabeth was depicted as a glamorous "fairytale Queen". After the trauma of the Second World War, it was a time of hope, a period of progress and achievement heralding a "new Elizabethan age". Lord Altrincham's accusation in 1957 that her speeches sounded like those of a "priggish schoolgirl" was an extremely rare criticism. In the late 1960s, attempts to portray a more modern image of the monarchy were made in the television documentary Royal Family and by televising Prince Charles's investiture as Prince of Wales. Elizabeth also instituted other new practices; her first royal walkabout, meeting ordinary members of the public, took place during a tour of Australia and New Zealand in 1970. Her wardrobe developed a recognisable, signature style driven more by function than fashion. In public, she took to wearing mostly solid-colour overcoats and decorative hats, allowing her to be seen easily in a crowd. By the end of her reign, nearly one third of Britons had seen or met Elizabeth in person.

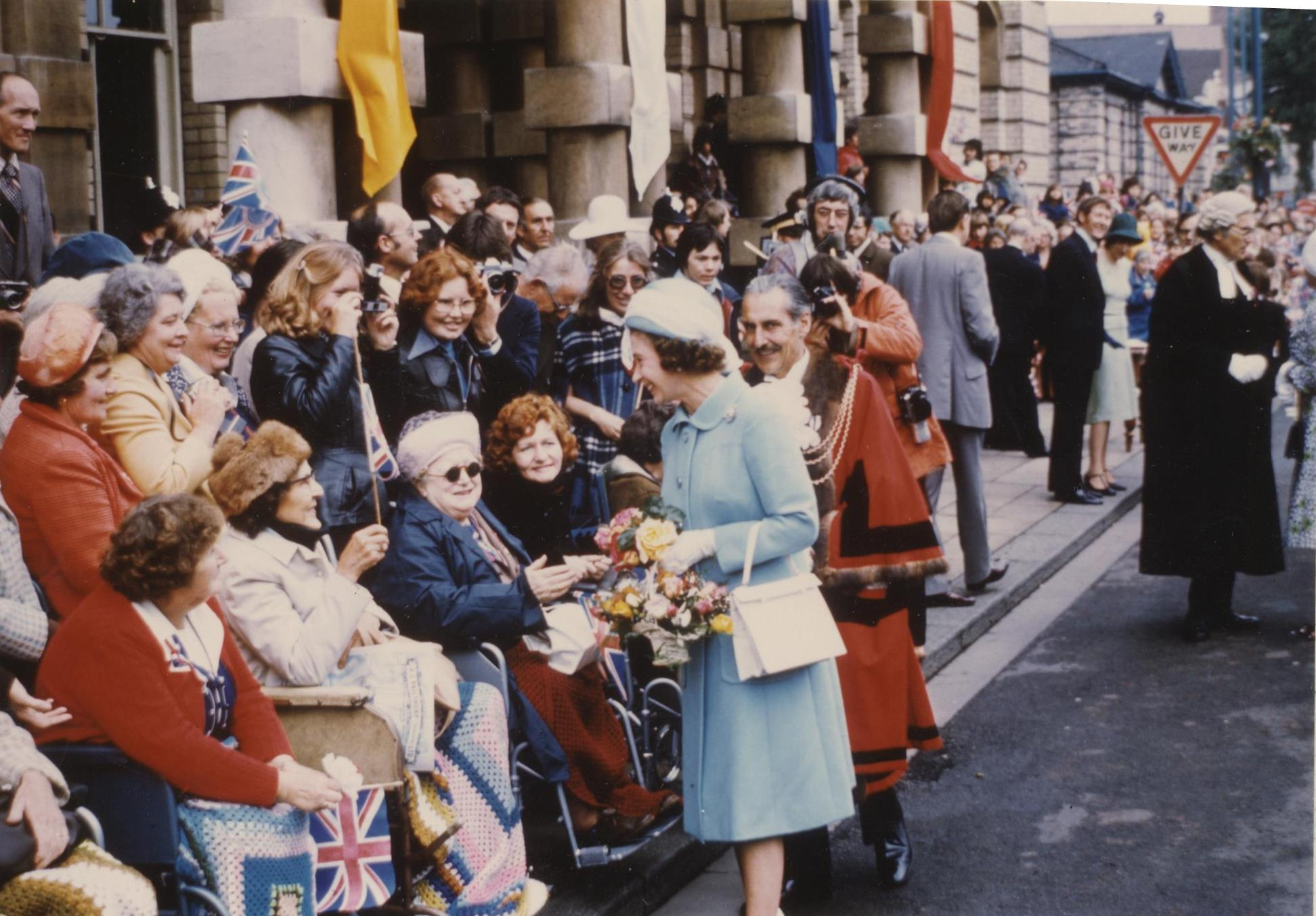
Performing a walkabout in Town Hall Square, Grimsby, 12 July 1977, during an event to mark her Silver Jubilee

At Elizabeth's Silver Jubilee in 1977, the crowds and celebrations were genuinely enthusiastic; but, in the 1980s, public criticism of the royal family increased, as the personal and working lives of Elizabeth's children came under media scrutiny. Her popularity sank to a low point in the 1990s. Under pressure from public opinion, she began to pay income tax for the first time, and Buckingham Palace was opened to the public. Although support for republicanism in Britain seemed higher than at any time in living memory, republican ideology was still a minority viewpoint, and Elizabeth herself had high approval ratings. Criticism was focused on the institution of the monarchy itself, and the conduct of Elizabeth's wider family, rather than her own behaviour and actions. Discontent with the monarchy reached its peak on the death of Diana, Princess of Wales, although Elizabeth's personal popularity – as well as general support for the monarchy – rebounded after her live television broadcast to the world five days after Diana's death.

In November 1999, a referendum in Australia on the future of the Australian monarchy favoured its retention in preference to an indirectly elected head of state. Many republicans credited Elizabeth's personal popularity with the survival of the monarchy in Australia. In 2010, Prime Minister Julia Gillard noted that there was a "deep affection" for Elizabeth in Australia and that another referendum on the monarchy should wait until after her reign. Gillard's successor, Malcolm Turnbull, who led the republican campaign in 1999, similarly believed that Australians would not vote to become a republic in her lifetime. "She's been an extraordinary head of state", Turnbull said in 2021, "and I think frankly, in Australia, there are more Elizabethans than there are monarchists." Similarly, referendums in both Tuvalu in 2008 and Saint Vincent and the Grenadines in 2009 saw voters reject proposals to become republics.

Polls in Britain in 2006 and 2007 revealed strong support for the monarchy, and in 2012, Elizabeth's Diamond Jubilee year, her approval ratings hit 90 per cent. Her family came under scrutiny again in the last few years of her life due to her son Andrew's association with convicted sex offenders Jeffrey Epstein and Ghislaine Maxwell, his lawsuit with Virginia Giuffre amidst accusations of sexual impropriety, and her grandson Harry and his wife Meghan's exit from the working royal family and subsequent move to the United States. Polling in Great Britain during the Platinum Jubilee, however, showed support for maintaining the monarchy and Elizabeth's personal popularity remained strong. As of 2021 she remained the third most admired woman in the world according to the annual Gallup poll, her 52 appearances on the list meaning she had been in the top ten more than any other woman in the poll's history.

Elizabeth was portrayed in a variety of media by many notable artists, including painters Pietro Annigoni, Peter Blake, Chinwe Chukwuogo-Roy, Terence Cuneo, Lucian Freud, Rolf Harris, Damien Hirst, Juliet Pannett and Tai-Shan Schierenberg. Notable photographers of Elizabeth included Cecil Beaton, Yousuf Karsh, Anwar Hussein, Annie Leibovitz, Lord Lichfield, Terry O'Neill, John Swannell and Dorothy Wilding. The first official portrait photograph of Elizabeth was taken by Marcus Adams in 1926.

== Titles, styles, honours, and arms ==
Royal cypher of Elizabeth II, surmounted by St Edward's Crown

Personal flag of Elizabeth II

=== Titles and styles ===
Elizabeth held many titles and honorary military positions throughout the Commonwealth, was sovereign of many orders in her own countries and received honours and awards from around the world. In each of her realms, she had a distinct title that follows a similar formula: Queen of Saint Lucia and of Her other Realms and Territories in Saint Lucia, Queen of Australia and Her other Realms and Territories in Australia, etc. She was also styled Defender of the Faith.

=== Arms ===
From 21 April 1944 until her accession, Elizabeth's arms consisted of a lozenge bearing the royal coat of arms of the United Kingdom differenced with a label of three points argent, the centre point bearing a Tudor rose and the first and third a cross of Saint George. Upon her accession, she inherited the various arms her father held as sovereign, with a subsequently modified representation of the crown. Elizabeth also possessed royal standards and personal flags for use in the United Kingdom, Canada, Australia, New Zealand, Jamaica, and elsewhere. Elizabeth approved her modified British arms on 26 May 1954.

Coats of arms of Elizabeth II

Coat of arms as Duchess of Edinburgh (1947–1952)

Royal coat of arms of the United Kingdom

Royal coat of arms of the United Kingdom for use in Scotland

Royal coat of arms of Canada

== Family tree ==
Family of Elizabeth II

Queen Victoria	Prince Albert
King Edward VII	Queen Alexandra	King George I of Greece	Princess Alice
King George V	Queen Mary	Louise, Princess Royal	Princess Victoria	Queen Maud of Norway	Prince Nicholas of Greece and Denmark	Princess Victoria of Hesse and by Rhine
King Edward VIII	King George VI	Queen Elizabeth the Queen Mother	Mary, Princess Royal	Prince Henry, Duke of Gloucester	Prince George, Duke of Kent	Princess Marina, Duchess of Kent	Prince Andrew of Greece and Denmark	Princess Alice of Battenberg	Louis Mountbatten, Earl Mountbatten of Burma
Queen Elizabeth II	Princess Margaret, Countess of Snowdon	Prince Philip, Duke of Edinburgh
King Charles III	Anne, Princess Royal	Andrew Mountbatten-Windsor	Prince Edward, Duke of Edinburgh
William, Prince of Wales	Prince Harry, Duke of Sussex	Peter Phillips	Zara Tindall	Princess Beatrice	Princess Eugenie	Lady Louise Mountbatten-Windsor	James Mountbatten-Windsor, Earl of Wessex

== See also ==
- Finances of the British royal family – UK monarchy's income and spending
- Descendants of Elizabeth II
- Household of Elizabeth II – Royal officials and supporting staff
- List of covers of Time magazine (1920s; 1940s; 1950s; 2010s)
- List of jubilees of Elizabeth II
- List of special addresses made by Elizabeth II
- List of things named after Elizabeth II
- Royal eponyms in Canada

== Notes ==
Elizabeth II House of Windsor Born: 21 April 1926 Died: 8 September 2022
Regnal titles
Preceded by George VI	Queen of the United Kingdom; 6 February 1952 – 8 September 2022	Succeeded by Charles III
Preceded by George VI	Queen of Australia; 6 February 1952 – 8 September 2022	Succeeded by Charles III
Preceded by George VI	Queen of Canada; 6 February 1952 – 8 September 2022	Succeeded by Charles III
Preceded by George VI	Queen of New Zealand; 6 February 1952 – 8 September 2022	Succeeded by Charles III
Preceded by George VI	Queen of Ceylon; 6 February 1952 – 22 May 1972	Republics established
Preceded by George VI	Queen of Pakistan; 6 February 1952 – 23 March 1956	Republics established
Preceded by George VI	Queen of South Africa; 6 February 1952 – 31 May 1961	Republics established
New title Independence from the United Kingdom	Queen of Ghana; 6 March 1957 – 1 July 1960	Republics established
New title Independence from the United Kingdom	Queen of Nigeria; 1 October 1960 – 1 October 1963	Republics established
New title Independence from the United Kingdom	Queen of Sierra Leone; 27 April 1961 – 19 April 1971	Republics established
New title Independence from the United Kingdom	Queen of Tanganyika; 9 December 1961 – 9 December 1962	Republics established
New title Independence from the United Kingdom	Queen of Trinidad and Tobago; 31 August 1962 – 1 August 1976	Republics established
New title Independence from the United Kingdom	Queen of Uganda; 9 October 1962 – 9 October 1963	Republics established
New title Independence from the United Kingdom	Queen of Kenya; 12 December 1963 – 12 December 1964	Republics established
New title Independence from the United Kingdom	Queen of Malawi; 6 July 1964 – 6 July 1966	Republics established
New title Independence from the United Kingdom	Queen of Malta; 21 September 1964 – 13 December 1974	Republics established
New title Independence from the United Kingdom	Queen of the Gambia; 18 February 1965 – 24 April 1970	Republics established
New title Independence from the United Kingdom	Queen of Guyana; 26 May 1966 – 23 February 1970	Republics established
New title Independence from the United Kingdom	Queen of Barbados; 30 November 1966 – 30 November 2021	Republics established
New title Independence from the United Kingdom	Queen of Mauritius; 12 March 1968 – 12 March 1992	Republics established
New title Independence from the United Kingdom	Queen of Fiji; 10 October 1970 – 6 October 1987	Republics established
New title Independence from the United Kingdom	Queen of Jamaica; 6 August 1962 – 8 September 2022	Succeeded by Charles III
New title Independence from the United Kingdom	Queen of the Bahamas; 10 July 1973 – 8 September 2022	Succeeded by Charles III
New title Independence from the United Kingdom	Queen of Grenada; 7 February 1974 – 8 September 2022	Succeeded by Charles III
New title Independence from Australia	Queen of Papua New Guinea; 16 September 1975 – 8 September 2022	Succeeded by Charles III
New title Independence from the United Kingdom	Queen of the Solomon Islands; 7 July 1978 – 8 September 2022	Succeeded by Charles III
New title Independence from the United Kingdom	Queen of Tuvalu; 1 October 1978 – 8 September 2022	Succeeded by Charles III
New title Independence from the United Kingdom	Queen of Saint Lucia; 22 February 1979 – 8 September 2022	Succeeded by Charles III
New title Independence from the United Kingdom	Queen of Saint Vincent and the Grenadines; 27 October 1979 – 8 September 2022	Succeeded by Charles III
New title Independence from the United Kingdom	Queen of Belize; 21 September 1981 – 8 September 2022	Succeeded by Charles III
New title Independence from the United Kingdom	Queen of Antigua and Barbuda; 1 November 1981 – 8 September 2022	Succeeded by Charles III
New title Independence from the United Kingdom	Queen of Saint Kitts and Nevis; 19 September 1983 – 8 September 2022	Succeeded by Charles III
Honorary titles
Preceded by George VI	Head of the Commonwealth; 6 February 1952 – 8 September 2022	Succeeded by Charles III
Military offices
Preceded by The Earl Jellicoe as First Lord of the Admiralty	Lord High Admiral; 1 April 1964 – 10 June 2011	Succeeded by The Duke of Edinburgh
Preceded by The Duke of Edinburgh	Lord High Admiral; 9 April 2021 – 8 September 2022	Succeeded by Charles III
