= Princesses Elizabeth and Margaret's Christmas pantomimes =

Series of annual stage productions

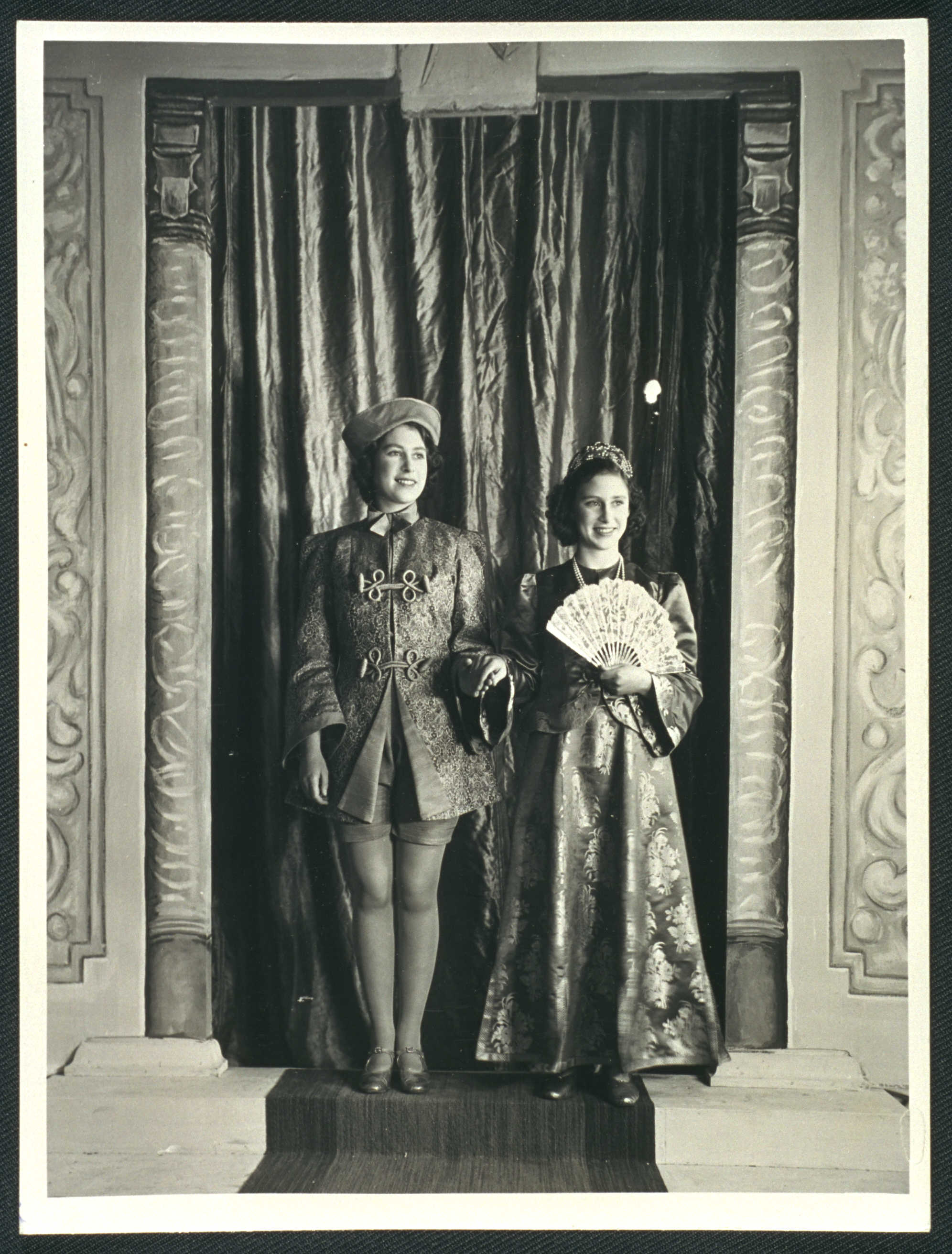
Princesses Elizabeth and Margaret in their 1943 production of Aladdin.

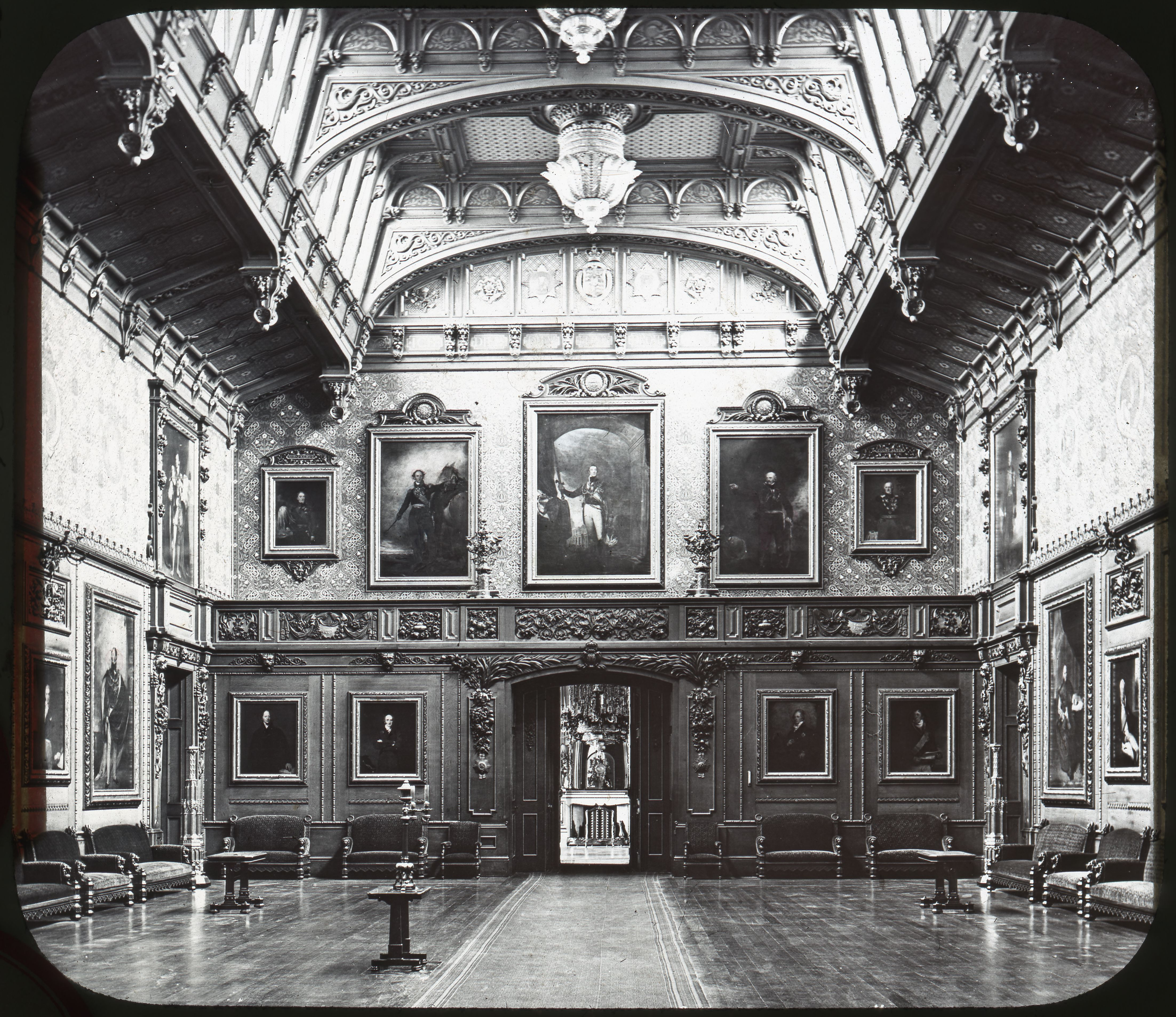
The Waterloo Chamber where the pantomimes were held.

From 1941 to 1945 a series of annual pantomimes were held at Windsor Castle by the British royal family. The young princesses Elizabeth and Margaret starred in the pantomimes and the performances were attended by their parents, King George VI and Queen Elizabeth.

The pantomimes raised money for the Royal Household Wool Fund. The fund supplied wool to knit comforters for soldiers fighting in World War II. Each pantomime had three performances. The performances were held in the Waterloo Chamber in Windsor Castle. The audience numbered from 300 to 600 people. Tickets were discounted for armed forces personnel. The princesses spent much of their time at the castle due to its safe proximity from London during the war. The princesses' fellow performers were local children and pupils of the Royal Windsor School.

16 large colourful pictures of characters from fairy tales decorated the space around the performances. The pictures took the place of paintings by Thomas Lawrence of figures from the Napoleonic Wars that were in storage for their protection during the Second World War. Upon the conclusion of the war and the restoration of the paintings, George VI decided that the pictures of Aladdin, Mother Goose and Cinderella would stay within the frames beneath the paintings of George III, George IV and the Duke of Wellington as a memory of the pantomimes. The pictures were painted by Claude Whatham, an evacuee and student at the Wycombe Technical Institute and School of Art. Whatham used the Throne Room as his studio, working alongside Gerald Kelly who was painting his portraits of the coronation of George VI and Elizabeth.

The pantomimes were written and produced by Hubert Tannar, the headmaster of the Royal Windsor School. The Salon Orchestra of the Royal Horse Guards (The Blues) provided the music for the pantomimes and a chorus of children from the Royal School performed the songs. The technical details of the productions were overseen by staff from the Ministry of Works and Planning who attended the dress rehearsals.

Cyril Woods, a 15-year-old pupil from the Royal School, played the comic parts in the pantomimes. Woods later worked in the accounts department at Buckingham Palace, and died in 2001, having spent his life working for the Crown Estate. In 1991 Elizabeth asked Woods to document his memories of the pantomimes and he subsequently sent her and Margaret an 18-page letter of his recollections.

An archive of photographs and programmes of the pantomimes and telegrams from Elizabeth and Margaret in two scrapbooks was put up for auction in December 2013. The scrapbooks were jointly owned by Tannar and Woods.

From 25 November 2021 to 31 January 2022 the princesses' costumes from the pantomimes went on display in the Waterloo Chamber at Windsor Castle in the exhibition The Princesses' Pantomimes.

== 1941 ==
The 1941 pantomime was Cinderella. Margaret played the title role and Elizabeth played the part of 'Prince Florizel'. Cyril Woods played the 'Buttons' role, named 'Buddy' in this production.

== 1942 ==
The 1942 pantomime was Sleeping Beauty. Elizabeth was 'Prince Salvador' and Margaret portrayed 'Fairy Thistledown'.

== 1943 ==
The 1943 pantomime was Aladdin. Elizabeth was Aladdin and Margaret was 'Princess Roxana'. Margaret wore a red silk dress with a matching jacket. Elizabeth wore a "gold brocade and turquoise jacket with turquoise dungarees and matching hat". The performance featured "topical and uncomplimentary digs" against the Japanese, who were one of the Axis powers opposing Britain and her allies in the war. The show had 40 children in the cast including the 8-year-old Duke of Kent and the 7-year-old Princess Alexandra. The production was photographed by Lisa Sheridan.

The production on the third night on 18 December was attended by the 22-year-old Prince Philip of Greece and Denmark, who had been invited by his first cousin, David Mountbatten, 3rd Marquess of Milford Haven. Philip sat alongside the King and Queen and another first cousin, Princess Marina, Duchess of Kent. The 17-year-old Elizabeth was greatly excited by Philip's attendance, having last met him four years previously. Her governess Marion Crawford recalled that "The pantomime off very well ... I have never known Lilibet more animated. There was a sparkle about none of us had seen before". Other royal family members in the audience included sisters Princess Helena Victoria and Princess Marie Louise.

== 1944 ==
The 1944 pantomime was Old Mother Red Riding Boots, written by the princesses and Tannar as a "mash up" of six traditional pantomime stories. Elizabeth wore a pink satin dress with lace sleeves to play 'Lady Christina Sherwood' and Margaret portrayed 'The Honourable Lucinda Fairfax' in a "blue taffeta dress with cream lace bloomers". The sets were designed and made by the chief designer of the film productions of Alexander Korda. Elizabeth subsequently told Gyles Brandreth that "We had a lot of fun. But I think we knew it was going to be our last. I was nearly nineteen and the war was gradually coming to an end".
