= 21st birthday speech of Princess Elizabeth =

1947 speech of the then-Princess Elizabeth

On 21 April 1947, Princess Elizabeth, the heir presumptive to the British throne, gave a speech that was broadcast to the British Commonwealth on her 21st birthday. Elizabeth was accompanying her parents, King George VI and Queen Elizabeth, on a tour of southern Africa. It was her first overseas tour.

== Background ==
The speech was broadcast to the "youth of the Empire" and was broadcast on the BBC Home Service in the United Kingdom at 6:55 pm on 21 April 1947, her 21st birthday. Her birthday had been declared a national holiday in South Africa. A description of her birthday celebrations in Cape Town preceded the speech on the Home Service. Elizabeth had spent the morning of her birthday at Government House in Cape Town after an earlier plan to ascend Table Mountain by cable car was abandoned due to inclement weather. Elizabeth then reviewed 7,000 troops and associated South African military personnel at a parade at Youngsfield Military Base in Ottery, Cape Town, that was attended by the South African cabinet. She then attended a rally of South African youth before returning to Government House to broadcast the speech. Elizabeth then attended a firework display in her honour before attending a ball at Government House where she was presented with a diamond necklace by the prime minister of South Africa, Jan Smuts.

== Content ==
Princess Elizabeth's 21st Birthday Speech
The full text of the speech at Wikisource

The speech was written by Dermot Morrah, a journalist for The Times, who was accompanying the tour as his newspaper's correspondent. Morrah was asked to write the speech by King George. The initial draft of the speech was almost thrown away by a steward on the Royal Train who was clearing up wine bottles but subsequently found. Morrah subsequently received a letter from Alan Lascelles, the private secretary to the sovereign, who thanked him for the speech and said that the moving passages in the speech had made Elizabeth cry. Morrah never publicly spoke of his authorship of the speech. Lascelles told Morrah that "Dusty old cynic that I am, it moved me greatly" and that to Lascelles it was reminiscent of Queen Elizabeth I's speech at Tilbury and Queen Victoria's quotation in which she promised "I will be good". Lascelles told Elizabeth that he was glad the speech had made her cry because "if it makes you cry now it will make 200 million other people cry when they hear you". The speech was made lighter in tone by the King and Queen and Elizabeth alongside Frank Gillard, who was coordinating the BBC's coverage of the tour.

The speech was pre-recorded on 13 April while Elizabeth was at the Victoria Falls Hotel in Southern Rhodesia, on the present day border of Zimbabwe and Zambia. Elizabeth was recorded reading the speech for a newsreel in the garden of the hotel before recording the speech for the later BBC radio broadcast.

In the speech Elizabeth said that she welcomed "the opportunity to speak to all the peoples of the British Commonwealth and Empire, wherever they live, whatever race they come from, and whatever language they speak" and said that the day brought "serious thoughts-thoughts of life looming ahead with all its challenges and with all its opportunity" but that it was "a great help to know that there are multitudes of friends all round the world who are thinking of me and who wish me well". Elizabeth said that she was "6,000 miles from the country where I was born, but I am certainly not 6,000 miles from home" as she and her family had been "made to feel that we are just as much at home here as if we had lived among them all our lives". She asked to speak as the "representative" of the youth of the Commonwealth who had grown up during the Second World War and said it was "surely a great joy to us all to think that we shall be able to take some of the burden off the shoulders of our elders who have fought and worked and suffered to protect our childhood". Elizabeth then quoted the poet Rupert Brooke ("Now God be thanked Who has matched us with His hour") and William Pitt the Younger ("England had saved herself by her exertions and would save Europe by her example") before saying that "If we all go forward together with an unwavering faith, a high courage, and a quiet heart, we shall be able to make of this ancient Commonwealth which we all love so dearly, an even grander thing-more free, more prosperous, more happy, and a more powerful influence for good in the world-than it has been in the greatest days of our forefathers. To accomplish that we must give nothing less than the whole of ourselves". She said that "the British Empire has saved the world first, and has now to save itself after the battle is won". She then spoke of the motto "Ich dien" ("I Serve") saying that "These words were an inspiration to many bygone heirs to the throne when they made their knightly dedication as they came to manhood. I cannot do quite as they did, but through the inventions of science I can do what was not possible for any of them" and that she could "make my solemn act of dedication with a whole Empire listening. I should like to make that dedication now. It is very simple. I declare before you all that my whole life, whether it be long or short, shall be devoted to your service and to the service of our great imperial family to which we all belong, but I shall not have strength to carry out this resolution alone unless you join in it with me, as I now invite you to do".

== In popular culture ==
- The cold open of 48:1 from the fourth season of The Crown featuring a young Princess Elizabeth (Claire Foy) reciting the now-famous birthday speech. The speech was briefly mentioned in the series finale Sleep, Dearie Sleep.

== Reception ==
Elizabeth's biographer, Matthew Dennison, believed that the speech was a "poetic precursor" to the oath she subsequently delivered at her coronation. Lascelles wrote that he was "a bit exhilarated by the tremendous success" of the speech. Elizabeth's grandmother Queen Mary wrote in her diary that she wept upon hearing the speech.
