= Sovereign states headed by Elizabeth II =

The realms, territories, and protectorates of Elizabeth II from 1952 to 2022 Realms as of her death Former realms Territories and dependencies as of her death Former territories, dependencies and protectorates

The number of independent countries where Elizabeth II was head of state varied during her record-breaking 70-year reign, altogether seeing her as sovereign of a total of 32 independent countries during this period. In her capacity as Queen of the United Kingdom (including the British overseas territories), she was also monarch of three Crown Dependencies— the Channel Islands of Guernsey and Jersey (as the Duke of Normandy), and the Isle of Man (as the Lord of Mann). As Queen of New Zealand, she was also monarch of two associated states within the Realm of New Zealand—the Cook Islands and Niue—after they acquired this status in 1965 and 1974, respectively.

The situations in two countries differ from the others. The government of the unrecognised state of Rhodesia proclaimed its allegiance to Elizabeth II as Queen of Rhodesia from 1965 to 1970. However, she did not accept either the role or the title and it was not accepted or recognised by any other state. Fiji became a republic through a military coup in 1987, after which its Great Council of Chiefs continued to recognise Elizabeth II as queen, or Paramount Chief of Fiji, until the council's disestablishment on 14 March 2012. This was only a ceremonial title, with no role in government.

== Status of the monarchy in each realm ==
During her reign, Elizabeth II served as the constitutional monarch of multiple independent states, each with its own legal framework. In all realms except the United Kingdom, her role was largely ceremonial, exercised locally by a Governor-General, though the specific constitutional powers delegated to them occasionally varied.

== Continuous realms (1952–2022) ==
In four Commonwealth realms alone was Elizabeth II the head of state for the entirety of her reign, from her accession upon the sudden death of her father George VI to her own death and succession by her son Charles III.

=== United Kingdom (since 1801) ===
Royal Standard of the United Kingdom (outside Scotland)

Royal Standard of the United Kingdom (Scotland)

The United Kingdom is the historic centre of the Commonwealth realms' personal union. The sovereign serves as head of state within a constitutional framework in which political authority is exercised by Parliament and the government, while the monarch performs ceremonial and constitutional duties such as appointing the prime minister and granting royal assent to legislation.

The Queen's reign was marked by significant changes in British government, especially in the devolutionary creations of the Scottish Government, Welsh Government, and Northern Ireland Executive in 1999 and the Greater London Authority in 2000. Northern Ireland held a 1973 referendum on whether to pursue joining with the Republic of Ireland to form a United Ireland or remain part of the United Kingdom. It was the first time that a major referendum had been held in any region of the country. The electorate voted to remain British in an overwhelming 98.92% landslide. In 2014, Scotland held a referendum on whether it should seek to secede from the United Kingdom, which was defeated 55.3% to 44.7%.

==== British Overseas Territories ====
During Elizabeth's reign, three British Overseas Territories voted upon referendums relating to their sovereignty:

- Gibraltar held sovereignty referendums in 1967 and 2002. The former asked whether Gibraltarians wished to adopt Spanish sovereignty whilst maintaining British citizenship, or remain under British sovereignty. Gibraltar voted to remain British by an overwhelming 99.64% landslide. The latter asked whether Gibraltar's should be shared by the United Kingdom and Spain. The referendum was also defeated with a landslide 98.97% voting against the measure.
- Bermuda held a referendum in 1995 on whether it should seek independence from the United Kingdom or maintain its status as a British Dependent Territory. Bermudians rejected the proposal with 74.12% voting against independence.
- The Falkland Islands held a sovereignty referendum in 2013, asking Falkland Islanders whether they wished to remain an Overseas Territory against the backdrop of Argentina's claim to the islands. With a 92 percent turnout, 99.80% voted to remain a British territory, with only three votes cast in favour of Argentina.

=== Canada (since 1867) ===
The standard of Elizabeth II, Queen of Canada (adopted 1962)

In Canada, the monarch serves as head of state within a federal system. The sovereign is represented by the Governor General at the national level and by lieutenant governors in the provinces. The monarchy forms a central component of Canada's constitutional structure and legal system.

The province of Quebec formulated proposals to pursue sovereignty by referendum in 1980 and 1995, but both were defeated 59.56% to 40.44% and 50.58% to 49.42% respectively.

Elizabeth first visited Canada as heir presumptive in 1951 on behalf of an ailing George VI. As sovereign, the Queen visited Canada in 1957, 1959, 1963, 1964, 1966, 1967, 1970 (thrice), 1971, 1973 (thrice), 1974, 1976, 1977, 1978, 1982, 1983, 1984, 1987, 1992, 1993, 1994, 1997, 2002, 2005, and 2010.

=== Australia (since 1901) ===
The standard of Elizabeth II, Queen of Australia (adopted 1962)

Australia shares the same monarch but maintains an independent Crown in right of Australia. Constitutional authority is exercised domestically by the Governor-General, who performs ceremonial functions and retains reserve powers under exceptional circumstances. The Governors of the Australian states further represent the monarch on the state level.

The 1998 Northern Territory referendum advocated for the Northern Territory to become a state, which was narrowly defeated, 51.9% to 48.1%. This came as a surprise to both the Northern Territory government and the federal government. A 1999 referendum to abolish the monarchy in favour of a president appointed by Parliament, and additionally to add a preamble to the Constitution of Australia, was defeated 54.87% to 45.13%.

The Queen visited Australia in 1954, 1963, 1970, 1973, 1977 (twice), 1980, 1981 (twice), 1982, 1986, 1988, 1992, 2000, 2002, 2006, and 2011.

=== New Zealand (since 1907) ===
The standard of Elizabeth II, Queen of New Zealand (adopted 1962)

In New Zealand, the monarch serves as head of state within an uncodified constitution derived from statutes and conventions. The Governor-General performs constitutional functions locally, including summoning Parliament and granting royal assent.

The Queen visited New Zealand in 1953–1954, 1963, 1970, 1973, 1977, 1981, 1986, 1990, 1995, and 2002.

== Extant monarchies created during Elizabeth II's reign ==
Eleven of the British colonies that became independent Commonwealth realms over the course of Elizabeth II's reign retained that status until her death.

=== Jamaica (since 1962) ===
The standard of Elizabeth II, Queen of Jamaica (adopted 1966)

Upon independence in 1962, Jamaica retained the monarch as head of state. The Governor-General represents the sovereign domestically, carrying out constitutional duties largely of a ceremonial nature.

The Queen visited the Colony of Jamaica in 1953, and the independent Jamaica in 1966, 1975, 1983, 1994, and 2002.

=== The Bahamas (since 1973) ===
The Bahamas became an independent Commonwealth realm in 1973. The monarch remains head of state and is represented locally by a Governor-General performing constitutional and ceremonial duties.

The Queen visited the Crown Colony of the Bahamas in 1966, and the independent Bahamas in 1975, 1977, 1985 (twice), and 1994.

=== Grenada (since 1974) ===
Grenada retained the monarchy at independence in 1974. As in other realms, executive authority is exercised by elected officials, with the Governor-General acting on behalf of the sovereign.

The Queen visited colonial Grenada in 1966, and independent Grenada in 1985

=== Papua New Guinea (since 1975) ===
Papua New Guinea became a realm in 1975. Its Governor-General is nominated by the national parliament, illustrating the localisation of the Crown within the country's constitutional system.

The Queen visited the Territory of Papua and New Guinea in 1974, and the independent Papua New Guinea in 1977 and 1982.

=== Solomon Islands (since 1978) ===
Upon independence in 1978, the Solomon Islands adopted a constitutional monarchy. The Governor-General performs most functions of the head of state within the domestic political framework.

The Queen visited the Solomon Islands Protectorate in 1974, and the independent Solomon Islands in 1982.

=== Tuvalu (since 1978) ===
Tuvalu retained the monarchy at independence in 1978. As with other realms, the sovereign's powers are exercised locally by the Governor-General. A 2008 referendum intended to abolish the monarchy and establish an indirectly-elected president was defeated by 64.98% of the vote to 35.02%.

The Queen visited Tuvalu in 1982.

=== Saint Lucia (since 1979) ===
Saint Lucia became a Commonwealth realm in 1979. The monarch serves as ceremonial head of state, represented by a Governor-General within the parliamentary system.

The Queen visited the colonial Saint Lucia in 1966, and the independent Saint Lucia in 1985.

=== Saint Vincent and the Grenadines (since 1979) ===
The country retained the monarchy upon independence in 1979. The Governor-General executes the sovereign's constitutional duties on their behalf. In a 2009 referendum, Vincentians rejected a proposal to replace the monarch with a president, with 56.29% of the vote to 43.71%, maintaining the constitutional status quo.

The Queen visited the colonial Saint Vincent and the Grenadines in 1966, and the independent Saint Vincent and the Grenadines in 1985.

=== Belize (since 1981) ===
Belize became a realm in 1981. The monarch remains head of state, represented by a Governor-General who performs constitutional functions in accordance with ministerial advice.

The Queen visited Belize in 1985 and 1994.

=== Antigua and Barbuda (since 1981) ===
Since gaining independence in 1981, Antigua and Barbuda has shared the monarch with other Commonwealth realms. The Governor-General exercises most constitutional responsibilities locally.

The Queen visited the Colony of Antigua in 1966, the Associated State of Antigua in 1977, and the independent Antigua and Barbuda in 1985.

=== Saint Kitts and Nevis (since 1983) ===
Saint Kitts and Nevis became an independent Commonwealth realm on 19 September 1983. The monarch serves as head of state, represented locally by a Governor-General, while executive authority is exercised by the prime minister and parliament. The federal structure of the state provides for the island of Nevis to maintain its own legislature and significant autonomy within the constitutional monarchy. A deputy governor-general acts on the governor-general's behalf in Nevis. Nevis attempted to separate from St. Kitts by referendum in 1977, desiring to become a separate Crown colony. Despite the "For" vote winning 4,193 to 14, the national government declared the result invalid. Following independence, Nevis again attempted to separate from St. Kitts in 1998, but was defeated as the "For" vote did not reach the required two-thirds threshold.

The Queen visited the colony Saint Christopher-Nevis-Anguilla in 1966, and the independent Saint Kitts and Nevis in 1985.

== Monarchies abolished during Elizabeth II's reign ==
During Elizabeth II's reign, three preexisting Commonwealth realms adopted republican constitutions while often remaining members of the Commonwealth of Nations.

=== Union of South Africa (1910–1961) ===
South Africa was created in 1910 with the unification of the Cape, Natal, Transvaal, and Orange River colonies. The monarch was locally represented by the Governor-General. Following a whites-only referendum in 1960, the country became a republic on 31 May 1961 and withdrew from the Commonwealth, later rejoining in 1994 after the end of apartheid.

The Queen later visited South Africa in 1995 and 1999.

=== Dominion of Pakistan (1947–1956) ===
Pakistan was a Commonwealth realm from its creation by the Indian Independence Act 1947 until 23 March 1956, when a new constitution created the Islamic Republic of Pakistan. The monarchy was replaced by a ceremonial presidency as head of state.

The Queen later visited Pakistan in 1961 and 1997.

=== Dominion of Ceylon (1948–1972) ===
Ceylon became an independent Commonwealth realm on 4 February 1948, retaining George VI as head of state. Upon Elizabeth II’s accession in 1952, she became Queen of Ceylon, represented locally by a Governor-General. A new constitution adopted on 22 May 1972 replaced the monarchy with a republican presidency and renamed the country Sri Lanka, while maintaining membership in the Commonwealth of Nations.

The Queen visited the Dominion in 1954, and the republican Sri Lanka in 1981.

== Monarchies solely headed by Elizabeth II ==
Fourteen of the British colonies that became independent Commonwealth realms during Elizabeth II's reign became republics later in her reign.

=== Dominion of Ghana (1957–1960) ===
Ghana became a Commonwealth realm upon independence in 1957. The Queen's constitutional duties were executed by the Governor-General. A referendum in 1960 established a republic with Kwame Nkrumah as president, ending the Queen's role as head of state.

The Queen later visited Ghana in 1961 and 1999.

=== Federation of Nigeria (1960–1963; entity created 1954) ===
Nigeria retained the monarchy upon independence in 1960, and the Queen's constitutional authority was exercised by the Governor-General. Nigeria became a republic in 1963 under a new constitution replacing the Queen with a president as head of state.

The Queen visited Colonial Nigeria in 1956, and the republican Nigeria in 2003.

=== Dominion of Sierra Leone (1961–1971) ===
The standard of Elizabeth II, Queen of Sierra Leone (adopted 1961)

Sierra Leone became independent as a Commonwealth realm per the Sierra Leone Independence Act 1961. The Queen was locally represented by a Governor-General. A republican constitution adopted in 1971 replaced the Queen with a president.

The Queen visited the Dominion in 1961.

=== Tanganyika (1961–1964; monarchy abolished in 1962) ===
Tanganyika became a Commonwealth realm upon independence in 1961 but swiftly became a republic in 1962. For that year the Queen was locally represented by the final colonial governor Sir Richard Turnbull as Governor-General. Following union with Zanzibar in 1964, the United Republic of Tanzania was established as a republic within the Commonwealth.

The Queen later visited Tanzania in 1979.

=== Trinidad and Tobago (1962–1976) ===
The standard of Elizabeth II, Queen of Trinidad of Tobago (adopted 1966)

Trinidad and Tobago became a Commonwealth realm upon independence in 1962. As with her other realms, the Queen was represented locally by a Governor-General. Constitutional reforms in 1976 established a republic within the Commonwealth. Ellis Clarke, the last governor-general, was sworn in as the country's first president.

The Queen visited the realm in 1966, and the republican Trinidad and Tobago in 1985 and 2009.

=== Uganda (1962–1963) ===
Uganda became a Commonwealth realm in 1962 but swiftly adopted a republican constitution in 1963. For that year the Queen was represented by Sir Walter Coutts as Governor-General, with Milton Obote serving as Prime Minister. The new constitution installed a president as head of state.

Queen Elizabeth visited the Protectorate of Uganda from 28–30 April 1954 and republican Uganda from 21–24 November 2007, the latter time to attend the Commonwealth Heads of Government Meeting 2007. The Kazinga National Park, in the west of Uganda, was renamed Queen Elizabeth National Park in 1954 to commemorate her visit.

=== Kenya (1963–1964) ===
Kenya became independent as a Commonwealth realm in 1963 but swiftly became a republic in 1964. For that year the Queen was represented locally by the final colonial governor Malcolm MacDonald as Governor-General with Jomo Kenyatta serving as Prime Minister. The new government installed Kenyatta as Kenya's first president.

Elizabeth II was in the Kenya Colony at the time of her father's death (6 February 1952) and had to quickly return to the United Kingdom, making this her first Commonwealth visit as sovereign. She later visited the republic of Kenya in 1972, 1983, and 1991 as an overnight stop en route to Namibia.

=== Malawi (1964–1966) ===
Malawi became a Commonwealth realm upon independence in 1964. The Queen was represented locally by Governor-General Sir Glyn Smallwood Jones, the last colonial governor of Nyasaland. In 1966, constitutional changes created a republic with Hastings Banda as president.

The Queen later visited Malawi from 22 to 25 July 1979. The Queen Elizabeth Central Hospital in Blantyre was opened in 1958 and is the largest hospital in the country.

=== State of Malta (1964–1974) ===
The standard of Elizabeth II, Queen of Malta (adopted 1967)

Malta retained Elizabeth II as Queen upon independence in 1964. Locally, she was represented by Sir Maurice Henry Dorman (1964-1971) and Sir Anthony Mamo (1971-1974) as Governor-General. Constitutional amendments in 1974 transformed Malta into a republic while remaining in the Commonwealth. Mamo became Malta's first president.

The Queen visited the Crown Colony of Malta in 1954, and the State of Malta in November 1967. She visited the Republic of Malta in 1992, 2005, 2007, and 2015. Her attendance at CHOGM 2015 was her final visit abroad as sovereign.

=== The Gambia (1965–1970) ===
The Gambia became a Commonwealth realm upon independence in 1965. Locally, the Queen was represented successively by Sir John Warburton Paul (1965-1966) and Sir Farimang Mamadi Singateh (1966-1970) as Governor-General with Sir Dawda Jawara as Prime Minister since 1962. A 1970 referendum established a republic, replacing the monarchy with an elected president.

The Queen visited the Gambia Colony and Protectorate between 3–5 December 1961.

=== Guyana (1966–1970) ===
Guyana became independent as a Commonwealth realm per the Guyana Independence Act 1966. The Queen's authority was delegated locally to the Governor-General with Forbes Burnham serving as Prime Minister. It adopted a republican constitution in 1970, replacing the Queen with a president. The last Governor-General, Sir Edward Luckhoo, served as acting head of state until Arthur Chung was installed as the first president on 17 March.

The Queen later visited Guyana in 1994.

=== Barbados (1966–2021) ===
The standard of Elizabeth II, Queen of Barbados (adopted 1975)

Barbados became independent as a Commonwealth realm in 1966. As with all other realms except the United Kingdom, a Governor-General exercised the Queen's constitutional authority on her behalf. On 30 November 2021, constitutional reforms abolished the monarchy and replaced it with a president as head of state. Final Governor-General Dame Sandra Mason was elected the republican regime's first president.

The Queen visited Barbados in 1966 and 1977.

=== Mauritius (1968–1992) ===
The standard of Elizabeth II, Queen of Mauritius (adopted 1972)

Mauritius retained the monarchy at independence in 1968. As with other realms, the Queen's authority in the country's constitution was mostly delegated to a Governor-General. In 1992, constitutional reforms created a republic while remaining a Commonwealth member state. The final Governor-General, Sir Veerasamy Ringadoo, became Mauritius' first president.

The Queen visited Mauritius 24–26 March 1972.

=== Dominion of Fiji (1970–1987) ===
Fiji became a Commonwealth realm in 1970 with Elizabeth II as Queen of Fiji, locally represented by a Governor-General. Following two military coups in 1987, the monarchy was abolished and Fiji became a republic, albeit without consent from the Fijian people.

The Queen visited the Colony of Fiji in 1953, 1963 and March 1970, and subsequently the Dominion of Fiji in 1973, 1977 and 1982 (twice).

== Unrecognised realm ==
=== Rhodesia (1965–1979; monarchy abolished in 1970) ===
Following the Unilateral Declaration of Independence (UDI) on 11 November 1965, Rhodesia recognised Elizabeth II as Queen of Rhodesia, despite the United Kingdom maintaining that the colony remained under British sovereignty. The Rhodesian government requested the appointment of a Governor-General to represent the Queen, suggesting the Duke of Montrose, but no appointment was made. In 1970, Rhodesia declared itself a republic, formally ending its claim to a monarchy, though the state itself remained internationally unrecognised. Per the Lancaster House Agreement of 1979, Rhodesia's independence was nullified, and the state attained internationally recognised independence in 1980 as Zimbabwe.

The Queen later visited Zimbabwe in 1991.

== Timeline ==
Realms at the time of her death, 8 September 2022
Former realms
Unrecognised realm (Rhodesia)
United Kingdom
Canada
Australia
New Zealand
(Union of South Africa) South Africa
Pakistan
(Dominion of Ceylon) Ceylon
Ghana
Nigeria
Sierra Leone
(Tanganyika (1961–1964)) Tanganyika
Jamaica
Trinidad and Tobago
Uganda
Kenya
Malawi
Malta
The Gambia
Rhodesia
Guyana
Barbados
Mauritius
Fiji
The Bahamas
Grenada
Papua New Guinea
Solomon Islands
Tuvalu
Saint Lucia
Saint Vincent and the Grenadines
Belize
Antigua and Barbuda
Saint Kitts and Nevis
│
1952
│
1962
│
1972
│
1982
│
1992
│
2002
│
2012
│
2022
Sovereign states headed by Elizabeth II between 1952 and 2022

== See also ==
- Commonwealth realm
- List of prime ministers of Elizabeth II
- Personal union
- Timeline of country and capital changes
