= List of international prime ministerial trips made by Benazir Bhutto =

This is a list of international prime ministerial trips made by Benazir Bhutto, the 11th and 13th Prime Minister of Pakistan, during her two non-consecutive terms in office.

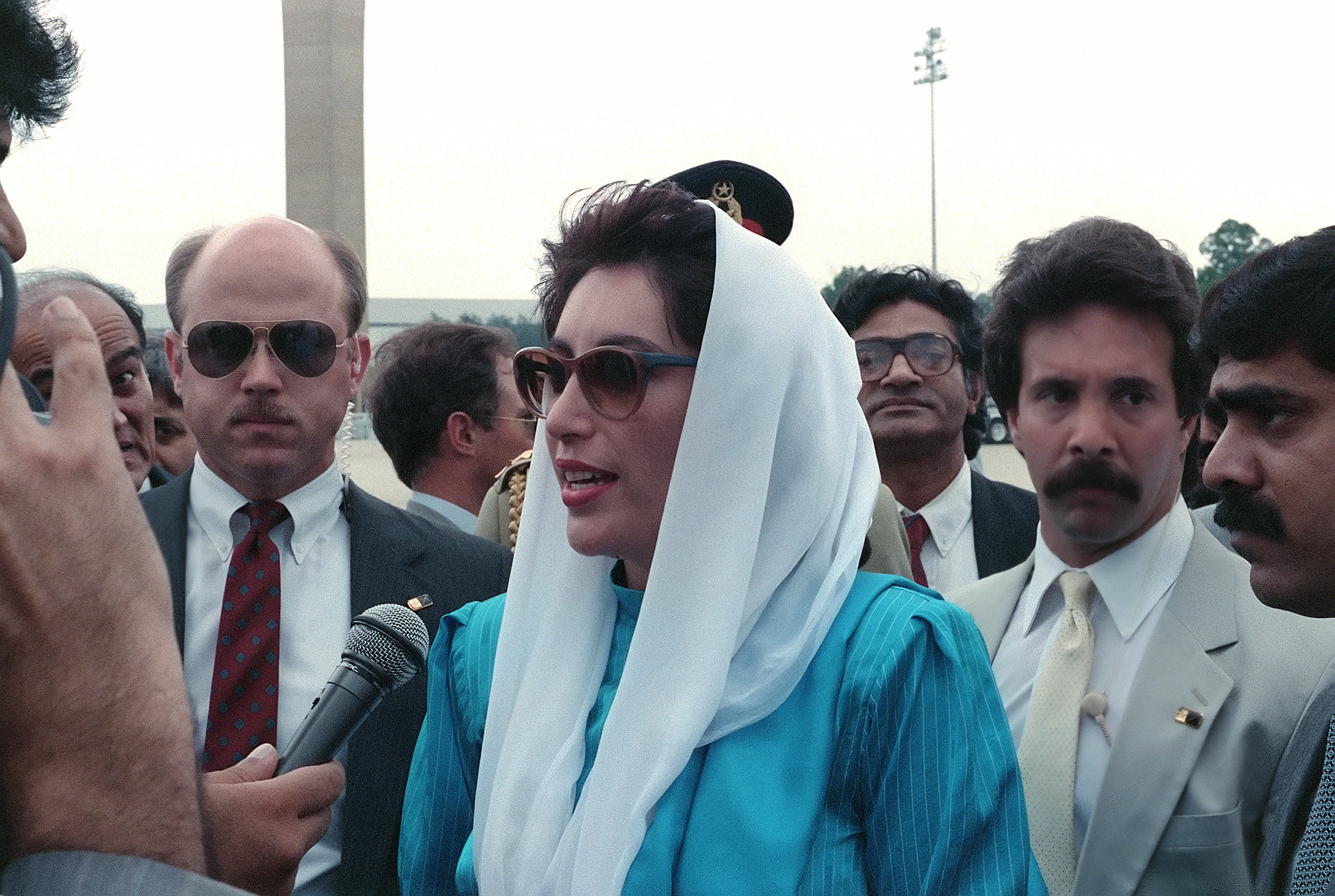
Prime Minister of Pakistan Benazir Bhutto in 1989.

== First term ==
=== 1989 ===
Country	Date/s	Engagements	Ref.
China	11–13 February	Paid her first official visit to China as prime minister. Held talks with Chinese leaders including Deng Xiaoping and Premier Li Peng.	
United States	5–8 June	Met President George H. W. Bush in Washington, D.C., addressed a joint meeting of the United States Congress, and delivered the Harvard University commencement address.	
UK	5–12 July	Met Prime Minister Margaret Thatcher during a week-long visit and also met Elizabeth II.	
Bangladesh	1–3 October	Paid an official visit to Dhaka and met President Hussain Muhammad Ershad; discussed bilateral issues including repatriation and cultural cooperation.	
Malaysia	18–24 October	Attended the Commonwealth Heads of Government Meeting in Kuala Lumpur, where Pakistan participated after its re-admission to the Commonwealth of Nations.	

=== 1990 ===
Country	Date/s	Engagements	Ref.
Iran	15 May	Began a diplomatic tour on the Kashmir dispute and regional issues; met President Akbar Hashemi Rafsanjani.	
Turkey	16 May	Continued the diplomatic tour in Ankara and held talks with Turkish leaders on Kashmir and regional affairs.	
Libya	21 May	Met Libyan leader Muammar Gaddafi as part of the same diplomatic effort.	

== Second term ==
=== 1993 ===
Country	Date/s	Engagements	Ref.
Cyprus	21–25 October	Attended the Commonwealth Heads of Government Meeting in Limassol and urged Commonwealth leaders to consider Kashmir.	
China	27–29 December	Paid an official visit to China, held talks with Premier Li Peng, and signed four agreements on bilateral cooperation.	
North Korea North Korea	29 December	Began an official visit to Pyongyang and attended a banquet hosted by President Kim Il Sung.	

=== 1994 ===
Country	Date/s	Engagements	Ref.
Bosnia and Herzegovina	2 February	Visited Sarajevo with Turkish Prime Minister Tansu Çiller and issued the "Sarajevo Declaration" calling for stronger action on Bosnia.	
Germany	18–21 April	Paid an official visit to Germany and met Chancellor Helmut Kohl.	
Nepal	24–26 May	Paid an official visit to Nepal and held talks with Prime Minister Girija Prasad Koirala on bilateral and regional matters.	
Egypt	4–6 September	Attended the International Conference on Population and Development in Cairo and addressed the conference.	
France	2–5 November	Paid an official visit to France; met President François Mitterrand and Prime Minister Édouard Balladur.	
Morocco	13–15 December	Attended the 7th Islamic Summit of the Organisation of Islamic Cooperation in Casablanca and addressed the summit.	

=== 1995 ===
Country	Date/s	Engagements	Ref.
Philippines	17–18 February	Paid an official visit to the Philippines and held talks with President Fidel V. Ramos.	
United States	5–15 April	Paid a ten-day official visit to the United States. Met President Bill Clinton and held talks on the Pressler amendment, F-16 aircraft, Kashmir, Afghanistan, trade and investment.	
Uzbekistan	22–23 May	Paid a two-day visit to Uzbekistan, met President Islam Karimov, and signed commercial agreements.	
Malaysia	6–9 July	Paid an official visit to Malaysia, met Prime Minister Mahathir Mohamad, and discussed economic cooperation and investment.	
Kazakhstan	23 August	Met President Nursultan Nazarbayev in Almaty.	
Kyrgyzstan	25 August	Met President Askar Akayev in Bishkek and discussed economic and transport cooperation.	
China	4 September	Addressed the opening session of the Fourth World Conference on Women in Beijing.	
Colombia	18–20 October	Attended the 11th Summit of the Non-Aligned Movement in Cartagena and addressed the summit.	
France	25 October	Met President Jacques Chirac in Paris and discussed bilateral cooperation, including defence matters.	
Iran	7–9 November	Paid a three-day official visit to Iran at the invitation of President Akbar Hashemi Rafsanjani, reviewing bilateral, regional and international issues.	

=== 1996 ===
Country	Date/s	Engagements	Ref.
Japan	16–20 January	Paid an official visit to Japan and held talks with Prime Minister Ryutaro Hashimoto.	
Brunei	5–7 March	Paid an official visit to Brunei and met Sultan Hassanal Bolkiah.	
Indonesia	7–9 March	Paid an official visit to Indonesia, met President Suharto, and signed agreements on economic and technical cooperation.	
Sweden	8–10 May	Paid a three-day official visit to Sweden and held talks with Prime Minister Göran Persson.	
South Korea	22–24 July	Paid a three-day official visit to South Korea and held talks with President Kim Young-sam on trade and economic cooperation.	
United Nations	3 October	Addressed the Fifty-first session of the United Nations General Assembly in New York City.	
