= List of international presidential trips made by Sheikh Mujibur Rahman =

The following is a list of international presidential trips made by Sheikh Mujibur Rahman while he served as the president of Bangladesh.

== List of visits ==
#	Country	Areas visited	Date(s)	Note	Ref.
	United Kingdom	London	8–9 January 1972	As the president of the Provisional Government of Bangladesh.	
	India	New Delhi	10 January 1972	As the president of the Provisional Government of Bangladesh.	
	Soviet Union	Moscow	1-5 March 1972	Goodwill trip	
	Canada	Ottawa	August 1973	1973 Commonwealth Heads of Government Meeting	
	Algeria	Algiers	5–9 September 1973	4th Summit of the Non-Aligned Movement	
	Japan	Tokyo	18-24 October 1973	Accompanied by Sheikh Rehana and Sheikh Russel	
	Pakistan	Lahore	February 1974	Organisation of Islamic Cooperation Conference	
	United States of America	New York City	September 1974	Sheikh Mujibur Rahman's 1974 speech at the United Nations	
	Egypt	Cairo	5-10 November 1974	He met with President Anwar Sadat	
	United Arab Emirates	Abu Dhabi	18-21 December 1974	Bilateral relations	
	India	New Delhi	26–27 April 1975	Met informally with Indian prime minister Indira Gandhi.	
	Jamaica	Kingston	28 April–7 May 1975	To join the 1975 Commonwealth Heads of Government Meeting.	
