= 1979 Commonwealth Heads of Government Meeting =

5th Commonwealth Heads of Government Meeting
- Host country: Zambia
- Dates: 1–7 August 1979
- Cities: Lusaka
- Venues: Lusaka
- Participants: 39 (of 39 members)
- Heads of State or Government: 27
- Chair: Kenneth Kaunda (President)
- Follows: 1977
- Precedes: 1981

Key points
- Lusaka Declaration; Rhodesia; Racism; Cyprus; Southern Africa; Apartheid

The 1979 Commonwealth Heads of Government Meeting was the fifth Meeting of the Heads of Government of the Commonwealth of Nations. 39 countries attended the meeting. It was held in Lusaka, Zambia, between 1 – 7 August 1979, and was hosted by Zambian President Kenneth Kaunda.

Issues discussed at the conference included the situation in Rhodesia, armed conflicts in Indochina, the global growth of the refugee problem, and the situation in Cyprus and Southern Africa. Sir Shridath Ramphal was reappointed as Commonwealth Secretary-General during the meeting. The Lusaka Declaration of the Commonwealth on Racism and Racial Prejudice was issued at the end of the conference, including a special declaration condemning apartheid.

== Participants ==
The following nations were represented:

Nation	Name	Position
Zambia	Kenneth Kaunda (Chairman)	President
Australia	Malcolm Fraser	Prime Minister
Bahamas	Lynden Pindling	Prime Minister
Bangladesh	Ziaur Rahman	President
Barbados	Tom Adams	Prime Minister
Botswana	Sir Seretse Khama	President
Canada	Joe Clark	Prime Minister
Cyprus	Spyros Kyprianou	President
Dominica	Michael Douglas	Minister of Finance
Fiji	Sir Kamisese Mara	Prime Minister
The Gambia	Sir Dawda Jawara	President
Ghana	Mensah Gbedemah	Armed Forces Revolutionary Council
Grenada	Maurice Bishop	Prime Minister
Guyana	Rashleigh Jackson	Minister of Foreign Affairs
India	Shyam Nandan Mishra	Foreign Minister
Jamaica	Michael Manley	Prime Minister
Kenya	Daniel arap Moi	President
Kiribati	Ieremai Tabai	President
Lesotho	C D Molapo	Minister of Foreign Affairs
Malawi	Hastings Banda	President
Malaysia	Tengku Ahmad Ismail	Minister of Foreign Affairs
Malta	Philip Muscat	Minister of Education
Mauritius	Sir Seewoosagur Ramgoolam	Prime Minister
New Zealand	Robert Muldoon	Prime Minister
Nigeria	H E Adefope	Commissioner for External Affairs
Papua New Guinea	Michael Somare	Prime Minister
Saint Lucia	George Odlum	Deputy Prime Minister
Seychelles	France-Albert René	President
Sierra Leone	Siaka Stevens	President
Singapore	Lee Kuan Yew	Prime Minister
Solomon Islands	Peter Kenilorea	Prime Minister
Sri Lanka	Ranasinghe Premadasa	Prime Minister
Swaziland	Richard Dlamini	Minister without Portfolio
Tanzania	Julius Nyerere	President
Tonga	Fatafehi Tuʻipelehake	Prime Minister
Trinidad and Tobago	Eustace Seignoret	High Commissioner to the United Kingdom
Uganda	Godfrey Binaisa	President of National Executive Committee
United Kingdom	Margaret Thatcher	Prime Minister
Western Samoa	Vaovasamanaia Filipo	Minister of Finance
