= President-in-office =

Government position that organizes meetings and representative bodies

A president-in-office or chair(man)-in-office (PiO or CiO; French: président en exercice) is the ambassador, foreign minister, or other official of the member state holding the presidency of an international organization, who is the individual actually chairing the meeting of the representatives from member states.

== Functional role ==
A president-in-office's roles are typically:

- Chairing meetings of the organization's decision-making or representative bodies (e.g., councils or committees).
- Coordinating and overseeing the organization's work during their term (typically operations).
- Represent the organization externally (relations with other organizations, institutions, or parties).

== Commonwealth of Nations ==
The head of government of the host nation of each biennial Commonwealth Heads of Government Meeting (CHOGM) becomes the Chair-in-Office of the Commonwealth of Nations until the next meeting. His or her main responsibility is to chair the CHOGM itself, but the role may be expanded over the following two years as required.

== See also ==
- Chairmanship of the Organization for Security and Co-operation in Europe
- President-in-Office of the European Council
