= 1977 Commonwealth Heads of Government Meeting =

4th Commonwealth Heads of Government Meeting
- Host country: United Kingdom
- Dates: 8–15 June 1977
- Cities: London
- Venues: Gleneagles
- Participants: 33 (of 35 members)
- Heads of State or Government: 26
- Chair: James Callaghan (Prime Minister)
- Follows: 1975
- Precedes: 1979

Key points
- Southern Africa; Gleneagles Agreement economic disparity Cyprus dispute Belize self-determination Uganda

The 1977 Commonwealth Heads of Government Meeting, officially known as the IV Commonwealth Heads Meeting, and commonly known as London 1977, was the fourth Meeting of the Heads of Government of the Commonwealth of Nations. It was held in London, United Kingdom, and was hosted by British Prime Minister James Callaghan. President Idi Amin of Uganda did not attend and, on the eve of the meeting, President James Mancham of the Seychelles was overthrown in a coup d'état and the country was not represented.

Issues discussed at the conference included the situation in Southern Africa, relations between richer and poorer nations, Cyprus, Belize, Uganda, and the issue of sporting contacts with South Africa. The Gleneagles Agreement on sporting contacts was reached at the meeting's retreat, in Gleneagles, Scotland.

== Participants ==
The following nations were represented:

Nation	Name	Position
United Kingdom	Harold Wilson (Chairman)	Prime Minister
Australia	Malcolm Fraser	Prime Minister
Bahamas	Lynden Pindling	Prime Minister
Bangladesh	Ziaur Rahman	President
Barbados	Tom Adams	Prime Minister
Botswana	Sir Seretse Khama	President
Canada	Pierre Trudeau	Prime Minister
Cyprus	Makarios III	President
Fiji	Sir Kamisese Mara	Prime Minister
The Gambia	Sir Dawda Jawara	President
Ghana	F W K Akuffo	Chief of Defence Staff
Grenada	Eric Gairy	Prime Minister
Guyana	F R Wills	Minister of Foreign Affairs
India	Morarji Desai	Prime Minister
Jamaica	Michael Manley	Prime Minister
Kenya	Daniel arap Moi	Vice President
Lesotho	Leabua Jonathan	Prime Minister
Malawi	Hastings Banda	President
Malaysia	Hussein Onn	Prime Minister
Malta	Dom Mintoff	Prime Minister
Mauritius	Sir Seewoosagur Ramgoolam	Prime Minister
New Zealand	Robert Muldoon	Prime Minister
Nigeria	Shehu Yar'Adua	Chief of Staff of the Supreme Headquarters
Papua New Guinea	Michael Somare	Prime Minister
Sierra Leone	Siaka Stevens	President
Singapore	Lee Kuan Yew	Prime Minister
Sri Lanka	Felix Bandaranaike	Minister of Finance
Swaziland	Maphevu Dlamini	Prime Minister
Tanzania	Aboud Jumbe	Vice-President
Tonga	Fatafehi Tuʻipelehake	Prime Minister
Trinidad and Tobago	John Donaldson	Minister of External Affairs
Western Samoa	Tupuola Efi	Prime Minister
Zambia	Kenneth Kaunda	President
