= 1971 Commonwealth Heads of Government Meeting =

First Meeting of the Heads of Government of the Commonwealth of Nations

1st Commonwealth Heads of Government Meeting
- Host country: Singapore
- Dates: 14–22 January 1971
- Cities: Singapore
- Participants: 32 (of 32 members)
- Heads of State or Government: 26
- Chair: Lee Kuan Yew (Prime Minister of Singapore)
- Follows: 1969 Commonwealth Prime Ministers' Conference
- Precedes: 1973

Key points
- Singapore Declaration; British arms sales to South Africa

The 1971 Commonwealth Heads of Government Meeting, officially known as the I Commonwealth Heads Meeting, and commonly known as Singapore 1971, was the first Meeting of the Heads of Government of the Commonwealth of Nations (formerly named the British Commonwealth). It was held from 14 to 22 January 1971 in Singapore, and was hosted by Singaporean Prime Minister Lee Kuan Yew.

This was the first meeting where Fiji, Tonga and Western Samoa participated.

British prime minister Edward Heath advised Queen Elizabeth II not to attend the conference, due to a row within the Commonwealth over Britain selling arms to South Africa. It would be the only CHOGM the Queen would miss until 2013.

Ugandan president Milton Obote was overthrown by Idi Amin in a military coup, whilst he was attending the meeting.

At the meeting, the Singapore Declaration of Commonwealth Principles was agreed, setting out the core political values that would form the main part of the Commonwealth's membership criteria. The final document was not ratified by Pakistan. Topics discussed at the meeting included Chinese representation at the United Nations, East-West relations, conflict in Southeast Asia, Portuguese violations of Guinean sovereignty and the situation in the Portuguese colonies, and the South African situation. Members also discussed the repercussions of a future Accession of the United Kingdom to the European Communities.

== Participants ==
The following nations were represented:

Nation	Name	Position
Singapore	Lee Kuan Yew (Chairman)	Prime Minister
Australia	John Gorton	Prime Minister
Barbados	Errol Barrow	Prime Minister
Botswana	Sir Seretse Khama	President
Canada	Pierre Trudeau	Prime Minister
Ceylon	Sirimavo Bandaranaike	Prime Minister
Cyprus	Makarios III	President
Fiji	Sir Kamisese Mara	Prime Minister
The Gambia	Sir Dawda Jawara	Prime Minister
Ghana	Kofi Abrefa Busia	Prime Minister
Guyana	Forbes Burnham	Prime Minister
India	Swaran Singh	Minister of External Affairs
Jamaica	Hugh Shearer	Prime Minister
Kenya	Daniel arap Moi	Vice President
Lesotho	Leabua Jonathan	Prime Minister
Malawi	Hastings Banda	President
Malaysia	Abdul Razak Hussein	Prime Minister
Malta	Giorgio Borġ Olivier	Prime Minister
Mauritius	Sir Seewoosagur Ramgoolam	Prime Minister
New Zealand	Sir Keith Holyoake	Prime Minister
Nigeria	Okoi Arikpo	Commissioner for External Affairs
Pakistan	Ahsanul Huque	Minister of Commerce
Sierra Leone	Cyril Foray	Minister of External Affairs
Swaziland	Makhosini Dlamini	Prime Minister
Tanzania	Julius Nyerere	President
Tonga	Fatafehi Tuʻipelehake	Prime Minister
Trinidad and Tobago	Karl Hudson-Phillips	Attorney General and Minister for Legal Affairs
Uganda	Milton Obote	Prime Minister
United Kingdom	Edward Heath	Prime Minister
Western Samoa	Tupua Tamasese Lealofi IV	Prime Minister
Zambia	Kenneth Kaunda	President
