= 1989 Commonwealth Heads of Government Meeting =

11th Commonwealth Heads of Government Meeting
- Host country: Malaysia
- Dates: 18–24 October 1989
- Cities: Kuala Lumpur
- Venues: Langkawi
- Chair: Mahathir Mohamad (Prime Minister)
- Follows: 1987
- Precedes: 1991

Key points
- Langkawi Declaration; Environmental sustainability Apartheid

The 1989 Commonwealth Heads of Government Meeting was the 11th Meeting of the Heads of Government of the Commonwealth of Nations. It was held in Kuala Lumpur, Malaysia, between 18–24 October 1989, and was hosted by Malaysian Prime Minister Mahathir Mohamad.

It was dominated by the issue of sanctions on South Africa, with Britain – represented by Foreign Secretary John Major – being the only country to oppose them, on the grounds that they would end up hurting poorer South Africans far more than the apartheid regime at which they were aimed. The summit ended acrimoniously, with British prime minister Margaret Thatcher issuing a second final communiqué, against established precedent, stating Britain's opposition to sanctions.

The Langkawi Declaration on the Environment was agreed and issued at the meeting.
