= List of international prime ministerial trips made by Bill Rowling =

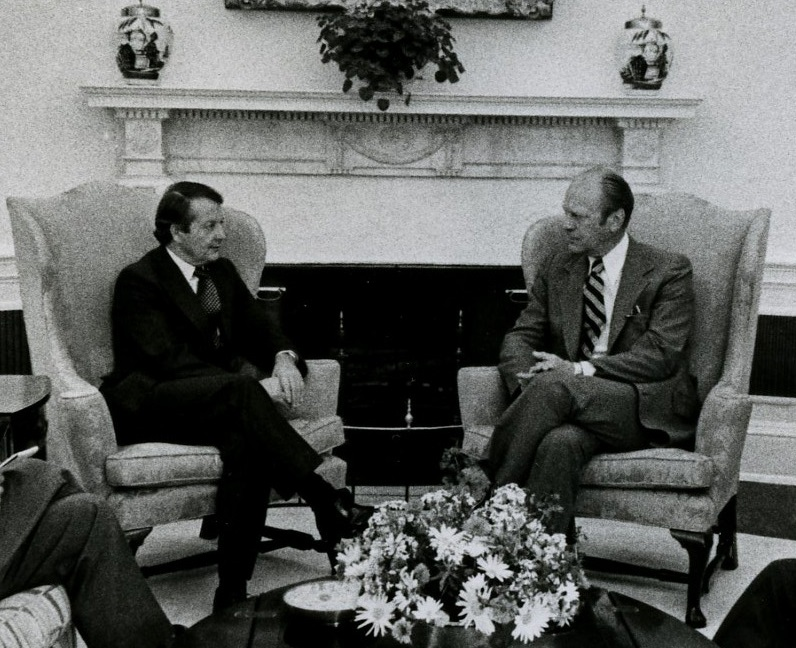
Rowling (left) with US President Gerald Ford in 1975

Bill Rowling, who served as the 30th prime minister of New Zealand from 6 September 1974 to 12 December 1975, travelled internationally to attend bilateral and multilateral diplomatic meetings and to lead trade delegations. During his premiership, Rowling visited 11 sovereign countries.

== Background ==
Rowling appointed himself as Minister of Foreign Affairs with Joe Walding as an associate and focused on external matters for much of his premiership.

== Summary ==
The table below lists Rowling's international prime ministerial trips, all made in 1975:

Country	Locations	Dates	Details
United Kingdom	London	9–12 February	Rowling held a bilateral meeting with Prime Minister Harold Wilson and met with other ministers and Opposition leader
Sweden	Stockholm; Gothenburg	12–15 February	Rowling held a bilateral meeting with Prime Minister Olof Palme
United Kingdom	London; Aberdeen	15–17 February	Rowling held a bilateral meeting with Prime Minister Harold Wilson and visited an oil rig in the North Sea
Belgium	Brussels	17–18 February	Rowling visited the European Commission
West Germany	Frankfurt; Hamburg; Bonn	18–20 February	Rowling held a bilateral meeting with Chancellor Helmut Schmidt
France	Paris	20–23 February	Rowling held a bilateral meeting with Prime Minister Jacques Chirac and President Valéry Giscard d'Estaing
Romania	Bucharest	23–25 February	Rowling held bilateral trade talks with Prime Minister Manea Mănescu
Yugoslavia	Belgrade	26–28 February	Rowling held a bilateral meeting with Prime Minister Džemal Bijedić and President Josip Broz Tito
Ireland	Dublin	28 February	Rowling held trade talks ahead of the European summit
United Kingdom	London	1 March	Rowling visited London to return to New Zealand
Australia	Canberra	23 March	Rowling held a bilateral meeting with Prime Minister Gough Whitlam
Jamaica	Kingston	29 April–6 May	Rowling attended the 1975 Commonwealth Heads of Government Meeting
United States	Washington D.C.	7 May	Rowling held a bilateral meeting with President Gerald Ford

== See also ==
- Foreign relations of New Zealand
