= 2003 Commonwealth Heads of Government Meeting =

18th Commonwealth Heads of Government Meeting
- Host country: Nigeria
- Dates: 5–8 December 2003
- Cities: Abuja
- Venues: Aso Rock
- Participants: 51 (of 54 members)
- Heads of State or Government: 38
- Chair: Olusegun Obasanjo (President)
- Follows: 2002
- Precedes: 2005

Key points

The 2003 Commonwealth Heads of Government Meeting was the 18th Meeting of the Heads of Government of the Commonwealth of Nations. It was held in Abuja, Nigeria, between 5 December and 8 December 2003, and hosted by President Olusegun Obasanjo.

The Zimbabwean issue was dominant, leading to one of the highest media profiles for a CHOGM in recent times. The dispute over Zimbabwe's suspension led to a dispute over the re-election of Secretary-General Don McKinnon, and, before the end of the meeting, Robert Mugabe's announcement that Zimbabwe was withdrawing from the Commonwealth. The Aso Rock Declaration reaffirmed the Harare Declaration of 1991 and set the 'promotion of democracy and development' as the organisation's priorities.

The meeting was attended by representatives of fifty-one countries out of the Commonwealth's fifty-four members (suspended members Zimbabwe and Pakistan were not invited, whilst Antigua and Barbuda sent no representative). Thirty-eight were represented by their Head of State or Head of Government.

== Zimbabwe ==
Rather predictably, but despite attempts to the contrary, the issue of Zimbabwe dominated. Some African members had spoken out against what they saw as the 'undemocratic' suspension of Zimbabwe, but were criticised for not respecting the principle of consensus, under which dissenting voices to an issue that had already been decided and voting on are usually only heard privately. Olusegun Obasanjo was seen to have acquitted himself well in the Commonwealth's position of Chairperson-in-Office in the manner in which he addressed this issue.

The issue was brought to a head in the election of the Secretary-General. The incumbent, New Zealander Don McKinnon, was nominated for another four-year term, and convention stipulates that an incumbent running again is to be unchallenged. However, President Thabo Mbeki of South Africa spearheaded a campaign to have Sri Lanka's Lakshman Kadirgamar elected in protest over the handling of the Zimbabwe matter. Nonetheless, African countries were divided, with only five African Heads of Government voting with Mbeki, and the attempt to move the election down the agenda to provide time to develop momentum for the movement was unsuccessful. With Mbeki's tactics failing, and with neither Kadirgamar nor the Prime Minister or President of Sri Lanka in Abuja, the challenge was easily defeated, by forty votes to eleven.

In response to the failure to overthrow McKinnon or to lift Zimbabwe's suspension, Robert Mugabe announced on 7 December that Zimbabwe was to leave the Commonwealth immediately: marking only the third occasion (after South Africa in 1961 and Pakistan in 1971) that a country had withdrawn voluntarily.
