= 1983 Commonwealth Heads of Government Meeting =

1983 meeting of Commonwealth leaders in India

7th Commonwealth Heads of Government Meeting
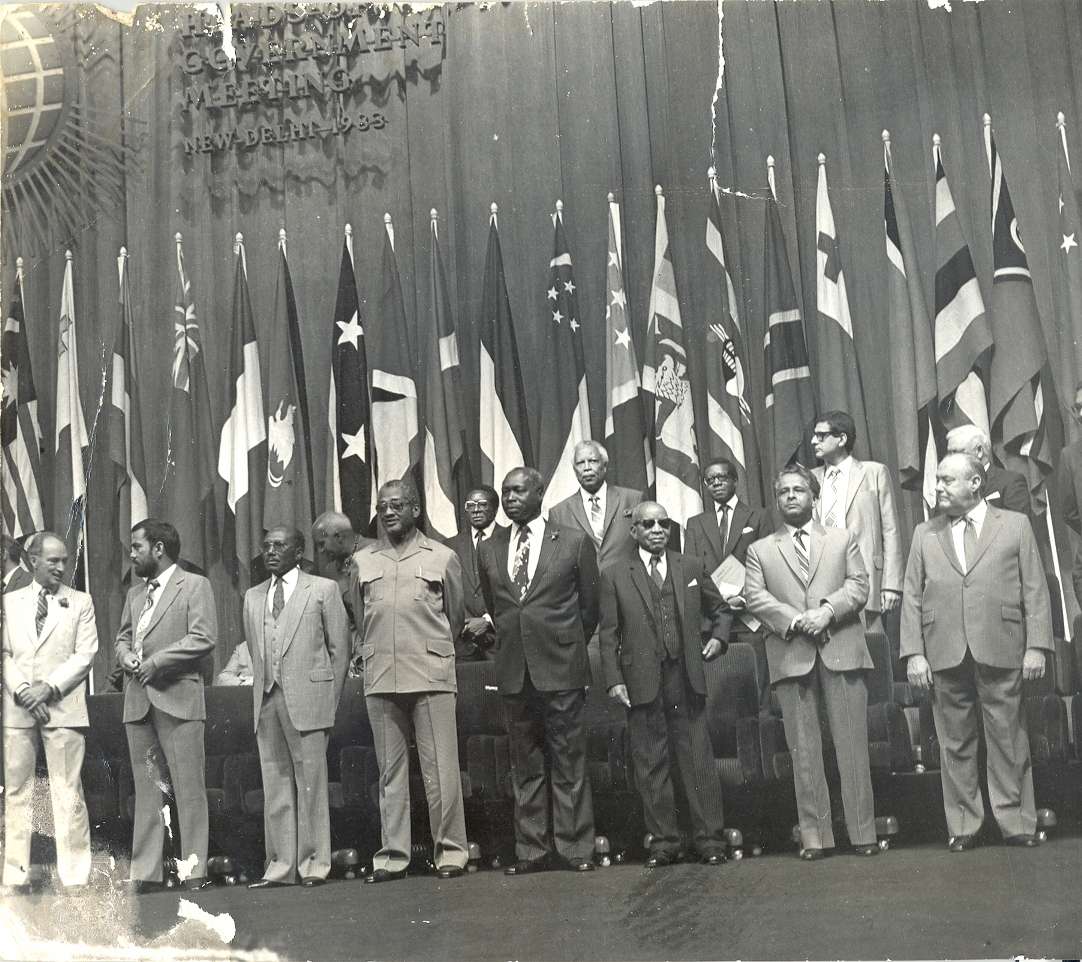
- Hastings Kamuzu Banda, President of Malawi, attending the meeting
- Host country: India
- Dates: 23–29 November 1983
- Cities: New Delhi and Goa
- Venues: Vigyan Bhavan
- Participants: 42
- Heads of State or Government: 33
- Chair: Indira Gandhi (Prime Minister)
- Follows: 1981
- Precedes: 1985

Key points
- Namibian independence United States invasion of Grenada; Nuclear disarmament

The 1983 Commonwealth Heads of Government Meeting, also known as CHOGM 1983, was the seventh Commonwealth Heads of Government Meeting of the Commonwealth of Nations. It was held in New Delhi, India, from 23 to 29 November 1983, under the chairmanship of Indian Prime Minister Indira Gandhi. A retreat was held in Goa.

The meeting was attended by representatives of 42 Commonwealth countries, including 33 heads of state or government. The principal subjects of discussion included the United States invasion of Grenada the previous month, South Africa's continued administration of Namibia, and nuclear disarmament.

== Grenada ==
The meeting followed the United States invasion of Grenada on 25 October 1983, which had the support of several Caribbean governments. The intervention caused disagreements among Commonwealth members, with some governments supporting the invasion and others opposing it.

== Southern Africa ==
Commonwealth leaders discussed South Africa's continued administration of Namibia and efforts to secure Namibian independence. The situation in South Africa, including the government's apartheid policies, was also addressed in the meeting's final communiqué.

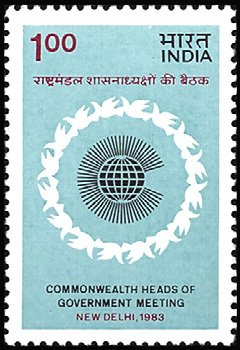
An Indian postage stamp commemorating the meeting

== Attendees ==
The following heads of delegation attended the summit.

Country	Representative	Position
Antigua and Barbuda	Lester Bird	Deputy Prime Minister
Australia	Bob Hawke	Prime Minister
Bahamas	Lynden Pindling	Prime Minister
Bangladesh	Hussain Muhammad Ershad	President
Barbados	Tom Adams	Prime Minister
Belize	George Cadle Price	Prime Minister
Botswana	Quett Masire	President
United Kingdom	Margaret Thatcher	Prime Minister
Canada	Pierre Trudeau	Prime Minister
Cyprus	Spyros Kyprianou	President
Dominica	Eugenia Charles	Prime Minister
Fiji	Kamisese Mara	Prime Minister
Gambia	Dawda Jawara	President
Ghana	K. K. S. Dadzie	Special PNDC Plenipotentiary
Guyana	Forbes Burnham	President
India	Indira Gandhi	Prime Minister (Chair-in-Office)
Jamaica	Hugh Shearer	Deputy Prime Minister
Kenya	Daniel arap Moi	President
Kiribati	Ieremia Tabai	President
Lesotho	E. R. Sekhonyana	Minister of Foreign Affairs
Malawi	Hastings Kamuzu Banda	President
Malaysia	Ghazali Shafie	Minister of Foreign Affairs
Malta	Alex Sceberras Trigona	Minister of Foreign Affairs and Culture
Mauritius	Anerood Jugnauth	Prime Minister
New Zealand	Robert Muldoon	Prime Minister
Nigeria	Shehu Shagari	President
Papua New Guinea	Michael Somare	Prime Minister
Saint Kitts and Nevis	Kennedy Simmonds	Prime Minister
Saint Lucia	John Compton	Prime Minister
Seychelles	Maxime Ferrari	Minister of Planning and External Relations
Sierra Leone	Siaka Stevens	President
Singapore	Lee Kuan Yew	Prime Minister
Solomon Islands	Dennis C. Lulei	Minister for Foreign Affairs and International Trade
Sri Lanka	J. R. Jayewardene	President
Tanzania	Julius Nyerere	President
Tonga	Tupoutoʻa	Minister for Foreign Affairs and Defence
Trinidad and Tobago	George Chambers	Prime Minister
Uganda	Milton Obote	President
Samoa	Tofilau Eti Alesana	Prime Minister
Zambia	Kenneth Kaunda	President
Zimbabwe	Robert Mugabe	Prime Minister
Commonwealth	Shridath Ramphal	Secretary-General

== See also ==
- 7th Summit of the Non-Aligned Movement
