= 2002 Commonwealth Heads of Government Meeting =

Summit

17th Commonwealth Heads of Government Meeting
- Host country: Australia
- Dates: 2–5 March 2002
- Cities: Coolum Beach, Queensland, Australia
- Participants: 51 (of 54 members)
- Heads of State or Government: 35
- Chair: John Howard (Prime Minister)
- Follows: 1999
- Precedes: 2003

Key points
- Commonwealth's future Terrorism; Zimbabwe

The 2002 Commonwealth Heads of Government Meeting was the 17th Meeting of the Heads of Government of the Commonwealth of Nations. It was held in Coolum, Queensland, Australia, between 2 and 5 March 2002, and hosted by the Prime Minister of Australia, John Howard.

Planned to have been hosted in Brisbane on 6 October 2001, the CHOGM was postponed only nine days before it was due to be held, on account of the 11 September terrorist attacks on the United States. When the meeting was finally held, three issues loomed large on the agenda: security, the future of the Commonwealth, and (most prominently) Zimbabwe's upcoming presidential election.

The meeting was attended by representatives of 51 countries out of the Commonwealth's 54 members (suspended member Pakistan was not invited, whilst Antigua and Barbuda and Grenada sent no representatives). Of those, 35 were represented by their head of state or head of government.

== Security ==
Originally slated to be hosted in Canberra, Australian Capital Territory the plan was changed so it would be held in Brisbane on 6 October 2001, making it two years since the previous meeting. However, on 28 September, in the wake of the 11 September terrorist attacks, it was postponed, to allow for improved security. Instead of the October summit, the Heads of Government issued a statement on terrorism and established the Commonwealth Committee on Terrorism, which met on 29 January 2002, reported in March, and recommended annual reviews of the Commonwealth's counter-terrorism strategy.

The postponement dealt a big blow to the Commonwealth, both in piling up costs on an already over-stretched budget and undermining the celebration and promotion of Commonwealth culture and values to Australia that the Heads of Government had hoped the CHOGM would be. The postponement ultimately raised questions of how credible and practical the CHOGM, and thus the present Commonwealth, could be. However, the civil society celebration went on as planned, except without the Heads of Government and media presence, and were deemed to be a great success, despite the surreal circumstances.

The CHOGM itself was highly security-conscious, due to the concerns raised by the attacks. The hotel compound was ringed by an electric fence, whilst the media representatives were transported by coach between venues. Security, originally budgeted at A$11.4m, was ramped up to include 4,000 Queensland Police, 2,000 Australian Defence Force, and over 100 Federal Police personnel. This, combined with the presence of only 30 accredited NGO representatives, gave the entire CHOGM the feel of a 'retreat without a retreat', rather than accessible conference.

== Zimbabwe ==
At the CHOGM, the Commonwealth made final arrangements for its election observer mission to Zimbabwe, which would consist of 42 observers and 19 staff from 26 countries. With the earlier withdrawal of the European Union's observers, the Commonwealth's delegation was to be the only fully international group judging the election's fairness. The CHOGM gave the 'troika' of Chairperson-in-Office John Howard, Thabo Mbeki, and Olusegun Obasanjo a mandate to assess whether the report of the observers met the Harare Declaration, and (if it didn't) the punishment under the Millbrook Programme. The observers' initial report was received by the troika on 14 March, and explicitly stated that 'conditions in Zimbabwe did not adequately allow for free expression of will by the electors'. In response, the troika, announced on 19 March 2002 that Zimbabwe was to be suspended from the Commonwealth immediately.

Two other countries that had been suspended were deemed to have shown progress. Fiji's suspension had been lifted by the Commonwealth Ministerial Action Group (CMAG) on 20 December 2001, allowing Fiji to take part in the CHOGM. Nevertheless, it would stay on the CMAG's agenda until Laisenia Qarase's government had been ruled constitutional by the Supreme Court. Even though Pakistan's suspension was not lifted in time for the CHOGM, the CMAG meeting on 30 January accepted Pervez Musharraf's plans for the elections in October, and recommended that the Commonwealth should send observers, with a view to lifting the suspension if the election was free of fraud or intimidation.

== Attendees ==
Country	Representative	Position
(Commonwealth of Nations) Commonwealth	Elizabeth II	Head of the Commonwealth
(Commonwealth of Nations) Commonwealth	Don McKinnon	Secretary-General
Antigua and Barbuda	No representation	
Australia	John Howard	Prime Minister (Chair)
(The Bahamas) Bahamas	Hubert Ingraham	Prime Minister
Bangladesh	Khaleda Zia	Prime Minister
Barbados	Billie Miller	Deputy Prime Minister
Belize	Said Musa	Prime Minister
Botswana	Festus Mogae	President
Brunei	Prince Mohamed Bolkiah	Minister of Foreign Affairs
Cameroon	François Xavier Ngoubeyou	Minister of Foreign Affairs
Canada	Jean Chrétien	Prime Minister
Cyprus	Ioannis Kasoulidis	Minister of Foreign Affairs
Dominica	Pierre Charles	Prime Minister
Fiji	Laisenia Qarase	Prime Minister
(The Gambia) Gambia	Isatou Njie-Saidy	Vice-President
Ghana	John Kufuor	President
Grenada	No representation	
Guyana	Bharrat Jagdeo	President
India	Jaswant Singh	Minister of External Affairs
Jamaica	Keith Desmond Knight	Minister of Foreign Affairs
Kenya	Daniel arap Moi	President
Kiribati	No representation	
Lesotho	Pakalitha Mosisili	Prime Minister
Malawi	Bakili Muluzi	President
Malaysia	Abdullah Ahmad Badawi	Deputy Prime Minister
Maldives	Fathulla Jameel	Minister of Foreign Affairs
Malta	Eddie Fenech Adami	Prime Minister
Mauritius	Anerood Jugnauth	Prime Minister
Mozambique	Joaquim Chissano	President
Namibia	Sam Nujoma	President
Nauru	René Harris	President
New Zealand	Helen Clark	Prime Minister
Nigeria	Olusegun Obasanjo	President
Papua New Guinea	Mekere Morauta	Prime Minister
Saint Kitts and Nevis	Denzil Douglas	Prime Minister
Saint Lucia	Julian Hunte	Minister of Foreign Affairs
Saint Vincent and the Grenadines	Not specified	
Samoa	Tuilaʻepa Saʻilele Malielegaoi	Prime Minister
Seychelles	Jérémie Bonnelame	Minister of Foreign Affairs
Sierra Leone	Ahmed Ramadan Dumbuya	Minister of Foreign Affairs
Singapore	Goh Chok Tong	Prime Minister
Solomon Islands	Allan Kemakeza	Prime Minister
South Africa	Thabo Mbeki	President
Sri Lanka	Tyronne Fernando	Minister of Foreign Affairs
(Eswatini) Swaziland	Mswati III	King
Tanzania	Benjamin Mkapa	President
Tonga	Prince ʻAho‘eitu ʻUnuakiʻotonga Tukuʻaho	Prime Minister
Trinidad and Tobago	Patrick Manning	Prime Minister
Tuvalu	Koloa Talake	Prime Minister
Uganda	Yoweri Museveni	President
United Kingdom	Tony Blair	Prime Minister
Vanuatu	Edward Natapei	Prime Minister
Zambia	Levy Mwanawasa	President
Zimbabwe	Robert Mugabe	President
