= Langkawi Declaration =

The Langkawi Declaration on the Environment was a declaration issued by the assembled Heads of Government of the Commonwealth of Nations on the issue of environmental sustainability. It was issued on October 21, 1989, at Langkawi, Malaysia, during the tenth Commonwealth Heads of Government Meeting (CHOGM).

The declaration covers a wide range of topics related to the environment, blaming 'past neglect in managing the natural environment and resources'. It lists what the Heads of Governments perceived to be the main environmental problems: the greenhouse effect, damage to the ozone layer, acid rain, marine pollution, land degradation, and species extinction. These, the declaration affirmed, were issues that transcended national borders, and hence required the involvement of international organisations, such as the Commonwealth, to coordinate strategies to solve them.

A key agreement in the formulation of the agreement was the pledge by developed countries not to connect future international development aid to commit to environmental sustainability or introduce trade barriers. This, the developing countries argued, would prevent economic growth (described as a 'compelling necessity'), and hence reduce their ability to develop sustainable natural environments. In exchange, the developing countries conceded to the Commonwealth's developed members (particularly Australia, Canada, New Zealand, and the United Kingdom) their interest in protecting the environment.

Amongst the commitments made by members in the Langkawi Declaration were:

- Support the development of an international sustainable development funding mechanism.
- Support the Intergovernmental Panel on Climate Change and recommend the Commonwealth's own report on climate change.
- Promote energy efficiency.
- Promote afforestation and sustainable forest management in developing countries, and the conservation of virgin forest to protect biodiversity.
- Restrict non-sustainable fisheries, including banning tangle nets and pelagic driftnet fishing, as part of a general trend amongst international organisations.
- Prevent dumping of toxic or hazardous materials in the oceans or in developing countries.
- Promote public awareness of environmental risks and issues.
