= 1991 Commonwealth Heads of Government Meeting =

12th Commonwealth Heads of Government Meeting
- Host country: Zimbabwe
- Dates: 16–21 October 1991
- Cities: Harare
- Venues: Victoria Falls
- Chair: Robert Mugabe (President)
- Follows: 1989
- Precedes: 1993

Key points
- Harare Declaration; Membership criteria

The 1991 Commonwealth Heads of Government Meeting was the 12th Meeting of the Heads of Government of the Commonwealth of Nations. It was held in Harare, Zimbabwe, between 16 – 21 October 1991, and was hosted by Zimbabwean President Robert Mugabe.

The Harare Declaration was issued at the meeting, setting out the Commonwealth's core principles and values and its membership criteria, expanding upon the Singapore Declaration which had been issued twenty years earlier.
