= 1995 Commonwealth Heads of Government Meeting =

Political summit

14th Commonwealth Heads of Government Meeting
- Host country: New Zealand
- Dates: 10–13 November 1995
- Cities: Auckland
- Venues: Millbrook
- Chair: Jim Bolger (Prime Minister)
- Follows: 1993
- Precedes: 1997

Key points
- Millbrook Commonwealth Action Programme

The 1995 Commonwealth Heads of Government Meeting was the 14th Meeting of the Heads of Government of the Commonwealth of Nations. It was held in Auckland, New Zealand, between 10 November 1995 and 13 November 1995, and was hosted by Prime Minister Jim Bolger.

The Millbrook Commonwealth Action Programme was agreed and announced at the CHOGM. The programme sets out the basic political membership criteria of the Commonwealth and introduces compulsory adherence to the Harare principles, providing incentives for members to adhere to democratic principles, good governance and the rule of law with bilateral and multilateral penalties for intransigent members up to and including expulsion from the Commonwealth. The Commonwealth Ministerial Action Group was established to monitor and enforce adherence to the agreement.
