= 1997 Commonwealth Heads of Government Meeting =

15th Commonwealth Heads of Government Meeting
- Host country: United Kingdom
- Dates: 24–27 October 1997
- Cities: Edinburgh
- Venues: St Andrews
- Heads of State or Government: 42
- Chair: Tony Blair (Prime Minister)
- Follows: 1995
- Precedes: 1999

Key points
- Development; Free trade Membership criteria Edinburgh Declaration; Microstates; Nigeria

The 1997 Commonwealth Heads of Government Meeting was the 15th Meeting of the Heads of Government of the Commonwealth of Nations. It was held in Edinburgh, Scotland, between 24 October and 27 October 1997, and hosted by Prime Minister Tony Blair.

It was the largest summit in modern Commonwealth history up to that point (a title to be taken from it by the 1999 CHOGM), with forty-two heads of state or government. It was also attended by Ahmad Tejan Kabbah, who had recently been ousted as President of Sierra Leone. Most notable, however, was the emergence of the civil society fringe of the 'People's Commonwealth', transforming a conference of policy-makers into a cultural celebration. For this reason, most participants and commentators considered it a success.

The appearance of Queen Elizabeth II, Head of the Commonwealth, at the opening of the CHOGM was a novelty. The monarch had never appeared at a CHOGM before, and it marked the beginning of a renewed interest in the Commonwealth from the monarchy. The rest of the opening ceremony was low-key.

The Edinburgh Declaration was agreed, endorsing the report of the Inter-Governmental Group on Criteria for Commonwealth Membership (IGCCM) which consolidated and revised previous rules and agreements which had developed over the previous 60 years.

== Economic declaration ==
The CHOGM was, unlike the preceding meeting in Auckland, an unspectacular affair with regards to policy. This was a result of a large number of newcomers to CHOGM, with twenty countries having new leaders, and the consequent requirement to build new personal relationships, which was compounded by the short retreat, which lasted only a few hours, but at which most business is usually done.

Chairperson Tony Blair pushed for a declaration of Commonwealth economic principles to mirror the Harare Declaration of the Commonwealth's political principles of six years earlier. Whilst this was achieved, it was greatly watered-down. The British plan was presented in a sophisticated paper by Robert Cassen and David Greenaway. The paper was rejected almost entirely. India, which opposed the request for another global trade round, scuppered the UK's plan to call for renewed trade negotiations, arguing that globalisation should be slowed. What was agreed included the holding of a biennial Commonwealth Business Forum, the creation of a Trade and Investment Access Facility to help globalisation adjustment, and the creation of a $110m South Asia Regional Fund.
