= 1999 Commonwealth Heads of Government Meeting =

16th Commonwealth Heads of Government Meeting
- Host country: South Africa
- Dates: 12–14 November 1999
- Cities: Durban
- Venues: George
- Participants: 52 (of 54 members)
- Heads of State or Government: 47
- Chair: Thabo Mbeki (President)
- Follows: 1997
- Precedes: 2002

Key points
- Chairperson-in-Office; Commonwealth's future Globalisation; Pakistan; Secretary-General

The 1999 Commonwealth Heads of Government Meeting was the 16th Meeting of the Heads of Government of the Commonwealth of Nations. It was held in Durban, South Africa, between 12 November and 14 November 1999, and hosted by President Thabo Mbeki.

Durban was the largest and best-attended CHOGM ever held. All fifty-two eligible countries sent delegations (Pakistan, which was suspended, and Tuvalu, a special member, were not invited), forty-seven of whom sent their head of state or head of government; Malaysia, the Maldives, New Zealand, Saint Lucia, and Sri Lanka were represented by lesser government ministers. Despite the size of the CHOGM, it was the shortest held, due to the diffusion of powers to other organs that met separately, and had a markedly lower profile than other CHOGMs.

The role of the Commonwealth Ministerial Action Group (CMAG) was questioned, in the light of the previous month's military coup in Pakistan, which necessitated Pakistan's suspension from the Commonwealth (hence its non-attendance). However, the competences of CMAG were unchanged by the CHOGM, and its remit was renewed for another two years. Pakistan itself was also not subject to any head of government ministerial action, and decision was postponed until a later date, once the fall-out from the coup could finally be assessed.

== Secretary-General ==
A new Commonwealth Secretary-General was elected to replace the outgoing Chief Emeka Anyaoku. There were two candidates: Don McKinnon, Minister of Foreign Affairs of New Zealand; and Farooq Sobhan, Foreign Minister of Bangladesh. In line with criticism of the role of CMAG from other parties, Sobhan ran on a platform of reforming the role of CMAG to cover not just democratic infringements, but economic and environmental ones, too. On the first day of the CHOGM, McKinnon was announced as the new Secretary-General-elect. The result of the vote (which remains secret) is reputed to have been thirty six votes for McKinnon to sixteen for Sobhan, but it was declared as 'unanimous' by chair Thabo Mbeki, in line with the formula established in 1989.

The CHOGM saw the creation of the position of Chairperson-in-Office, which was intended to give inter-governmental continuity between CHOGMs. Thabo Mbeki became the first Chairperson-in-Office, although he did little in the following two and a half years in the role.
