= Commonwealth Business Council =

- Logo of the CBC
- Abbreviation: CBC
- Formation: 1997
- Dissolved: July 2014
- Parent organisation: Commonwealth of Nations

The Commonwealth Business Council (CBC) was an institution of the Commonwealth Family that aimed to use the global network of the Commonwealth of Nations more effectively for the promotion of global trade and investment for shared prosperity. It was formed at the Commonwealth Heads of Government Meeting 1997 (CHOGM) in Edinburgh, United Kingdom, and replaced in July 2014 by the Commonwealth Enterprise and Investment Council (CWEIC).

== Activities ==
The CBC acted as a bridge for cooperation between business and government, concentrating efforts on these specific areas:

- Enhancing Trade
- Mobilising Investment
- Promoting Corporate Citizenship
- Facilitating ICT for Development
- Public Private Partnerships

Commonwealth countries are major stakeholders in the process and success of the Doha Development Agenda. Together the Commonwealth's 53 member countries account for 30 per cent of the world's population and about 25 per cent of its international trade and investment. Commonwealth countries account for 40 per cent of WTO membership. CBC's trade development objectives include encouraging trade facilitation and further liberalisation of services; encouraging developing countries to play an active role in the World Trade Organization, and in new trade rounds, by maximising their negotiating strength through cooperative action.

The CBC helps to mobilise investment into Commonwealth countries through measures including ensuring access to international capital markets; strengthening 26 domestic capital markets; encouraging regional integration; committing the private sector to work together with governments to help achieve a successful market economy for generating investment.

A key feature of CBC was its global membership, comprising corporate members from both developed and developing countries. This gave CBC the capacity to make a special contribution to the debate on corporate citizenship, dominated by developed countries.

== Purpose ==
The CBC worked to involve private sector engagement in facilitating the implementation of an Information Communications Technologies for Development programme. The CBC programme enhanced collaborative partnerships between the various stakeholders including governments, private sector, donor agencies and civil society. Major goals included:

- Bridge the digital divide for both social and economic development.
- Promote ICT for Development in Commonwealth countries.
- Promote an experience exchange among stakeholders in Commonwealth countries.
- Promote business and government cooperation for development.
- Create awareness and enhance the knowledge of policy makers regarding economic, technical and legal aspects of implementation of ICT for development.
- Provide and facilitate training and capacity building.

CBC believed that there was a significant gap for independent support to emerging market governments in the structuring and transacting of ICT infrastructure opportunities. The key CBC objectives were:

- Examine how support from highly experienced individuals can assist through the creation of an infrastructure technical advisory unit.
- Provide senior-level government support to provide focused advice.
- Provide mechanisms that will help governments leverage the huge capacity of the private sector to address the demand for better infrastructure.

The Commonwealth Business Council went into liquidation in 2014.
