= 1993 Commonwealth Heads of Government Meeting =

13th Commonwealth Heads of Government Meeting
- Host country: Cyprus
- Dates: 21–25 October 1993
- Cities: Limassol
- Chair: Glafcos Clerides (President)
- Follows: 1991
- Precedes: 1995

Key points
- Cyprus dispute South Africa; Sierra Leone; Global free trade and GATT; Conflict resolution Human rights

The 1993 Commonwealth Heads of Government Meeting was the 13th Meeting of the Heads of Government of the Commonwealth of Nations. It was held in Limassol, Cyprus, between 21 October 1993 and 25 October 1993, and was hosted by Cypriot President Glafcos Clerides.

The communique issued by Commonwealth leaders reiterated the organization's "support for the independence, sovereignty, territorial integrity, unity and non-aligned status of the Republic of Cyprus" and urged compliance with United Nations Resolutions on Cyprus and the need for Turkish forces and settlers to withdraw from Northern Cyprus. The meeting also agreed to lift economic sanctions against South Africa in light of moves by the government to end apartheid and grant voting rights to the non-white majority but also agreed to continue its arms embargo until a new non-racial government was elected. The leaders agreed to conditionally accept Cameroon as a member due to improvements in its human rights situation with the proviso that it fully comply with the Harare Declaration on pluralism and human rights by 1995. Commitments were also sought from Sierra Leone's military government for quick elections and a return to democracy. While the country's foreign minister reiterated its intention to hold elections within three years the government did not commit to a date. The summit also agreed that global free trade was desirable and agreed to send a five country delegation to represent the Commonwealth at the current round of talks on the General Agreement on Tariffs and Trade. Finally, while the Commonwealth Secretariat had said that a goal of the summit would be the development of a declaration of a 'global humanitarian order', no agreement was reached on specifics of conflict resolution and human rights and a group was appointed instead to study the problem.
