= 1981 Commonwealth Heads of Government Meeting =

6th Commonwealth Heads of Government Meeting
- Host country: Australia
- Dates: 30 September–7 October 1981
- Cities: Melbourne and Canberra (retreat)
- Participants: 41
- Heads of State or Government: 30
- Chair: Malcolm Fraser (Prime Minister)
- Follows: 1979
- Precedes: 1983

Key points
- Melbourne Declaration; International economic relations Apartheid and Namibian independence

The 1981 Commonwealth Heads of Government Meeting was the sixth Meeting of the Heads of Government of the Commonwealth of Nations. It was held in Melbourne, Victoria, between 30 September 1981 and 7 October 1981, and was hosted by Australian Prime Minister Malcolm Fraser.

Representatives of 41 Commonwealth countries attended, including 30 heads of state or government.

Shridath Ramphal served as Commonwealth Secretary-General. Key participants included British Prime Minister Margaret Thatcher, Indian Prime Minister Indira Gandhi, Jamaican Prime Minister Edward Seaga and Kenyan President Daniel arap Moi.

The meeting adopted the Melbourne Declaration, which called for renewed negotiations on international economic relations between developed and developing countries.

== Background ==
The meeting took place amid disagreements between industrialised and developing countries over international trade, finance and economic development. Developing countries had called for changes to the international economic system through proposals associated with the New International Economic Order.

The previous 1979 Commonwealth Heads of Government Meeting, held in Lusaka, Zambia, had addressed the political situation in Rhodesia, contributing to the negotiations that preceded Zimbabwe's independence in April 1980. At Melbourne, attention remained focused on Southern Africa, particularly South Africa's apartheid system and its continued administration of Namibia.

The summit also followed the independence of Belize on 21 September 1981. Antigua and Barbuda became independent and joined the Commonwealth on 1 November, after the meeting.

== Proceedings ==
The meeting opened in Melbourne on 30 September 1981. Discussions continued during a retreat in Canberra before the summit concluded on 7 October.

Elizabeth II attended in her capacity as Head of the Commonwealth. During her visit to Australia, she hosted a dinner for heads of delegation aboard HMY Britannia on 30 September.

== Melbourne Declaration ==
The Melbourne Declaration, adopted on 3 October, expressed concern about economic inequalities and the difficulties faced by poorer countries in obtaining the resources needed for development.

The declaration emphasised the interdependence of national economies and urged governments to pursue international cooperation on trade, finance and development. It called for progress in negotiations between industrialised and developing countries over international economic arrangements.

The declaration did not establish a detailed programme of economic reforms. New Zealand Prime Minister Robert Muldoon criticised its general language, describing it as a "declaration of platitudes". Commonwealth officials maintained that it was intended as a political statement, while more specific economic questions were addressed in the meeting's final communiqué.

== Southern Africa ==
The meeting considered the situation in Southern Africa, including the continuation of apartheid in South Africa and the dispute over Namibian independence. Namibia remained under South African administration despite international efforts to secure its independence.

The papers prepared for the summit included a report from the Commonwealth Committee on Southern Africa addressing Namibia, regional economic cooperation and assistance to South African refugee students.

== Attendees ==
The following heads of delegation attended the 1981 Commonwealth Heads of Government Meeting in Australia.

| Country | Representative | Position |
|---|---|---|
| Commonwealth | Elizabeth II | Head of the Commonwealth |
| Commonwealth | Shridath Ramphal | Secretary-General |
| Australia | Malcolm Fraser (Chair-in-Office) | Prime Minister |
| Bahamas | R. F. Anthony Roberts | High Commissioner to the United Kingdom |
| Bangladesh | Shah Azizur Rahman | Prime Minister |
| Barbados | J. M. G. M. Adams | Prime Minister |
| Belize | George Cadle Price | Prime Minister |
| Botswana | Quett Masire | President |
| United Kingdom | Margaret Thatcher | Prime Minister |
| Canada | Pierre Trudeau | Prime Minister |
| Cyprus | Spyros Kyprianou | President |
| Fiji | Kamisese Mara | Prime Minister |
| Gambia | Assan Musa Camara | Vice-President |
| Ghana | Isaac Chinebuah | Minister of Foreign Affairs |
| Grenada | Maurice Bishop | Prime Minister |
| Guyana | Forbes Burnham | President |
| India | Indira Gandhi | Prime Minister |
| Jamaica | Edward Seaga | Prime Minister |
| Kenya | Daniel arap Moi | President |
| Kiribati | Ieremia Tabai | President |
| Lesotho | M. V. Molapo | Minister of Foreign Affairs |
| Malawi | Hastings Kamuzu Banda | President |
| Malaysia | Ghazali Shafie | Minister of Foreign Affairs |
| Malta | Joseph Brincat | Minister of Justice |
| Mauritius | Seewoosagur Ramgoolam | Prime Minister |
| New Zealand | Robert Muldoon | Prime Minister |
| Nigeria | Shehu Shagari | President |
| Papua New Guinea | Julius Chan | Prime Minister |
| Saint Lucia | Peter Josie | Minister for Foreign Affairs |
| Seychelles | Jacques Hodoul | Minister of Foreign Affairs |
| Sierra Leone | Abdul Osman Conteh | Minister of Foreign Affairs |
| Singapore | Lee Kuan Yew | Prime Minister |
| Solomon Islands | Ezekiel Alebua | Minister of Foreign Affairs and International Trade |
| Sri Lanka | Ranasinghe Premadasa | Prime Minister |
| Swaziland | Mabandla Dlamini | Prime Minister |
| Tanzania | Julius Nyerere | President |
| Tonga | Fatafehi Tuʻipelehake | Prime Minister |
| Trinidad and Tobago | Isidore C. Rampersad | Permanent Secretary to the Prime Minister and Head of the Civil Service |
| Uganda | Otema Alimadi | Prime Minister |
| Vanuatu | Walter Lini | Prime Minister |
| Samoa | Tui Atua Tupua Tamasese Efi | Prime Minister |
| Zambia | Kenneth Kaunda | President |
| Zimbabwe | Robert Mugabe | Prime Minister |
