= Commonwealth Heads of Government Meeting =

Biennial summit of the leaders of Commonwealth of Nations member states

The twenty-six Commonwealth Heads of Government Meetings have been hosted by eighteen countries in twenty-three cities across five continents.

The Commonwealth Heads of Government Meeting (CHOGM; /ˈtʃɒɡəm/ or/ˈtʃoʊm/) is a biennial summit meeting of the governmental leaders from all Commonwealth nations. Despite the name, the head of state may be present in the meeting instead of the head of government, especially among semi-presidential states. (Note: Commonwealth Heads of Government Meeting 2013, for example, Sri Lankan President Mahinda Rajapaksa, instead of Sri Lankan Prime Minister D. M. Jayaratne, was the meeting chairman.) Every two years the meeting is held in a different member state and is chaired by that nation's respective prime minister or president, who becomes the Commonwealth Chair-in-Office until the next meeting. Queen Elizabeth II, who was the Head of the Commonwealth, attended every CHOGM beginning with Ottawa in 1973 until Perth in 2011, although her formal participation only began in 1997. She was represented by the Prince of Wales at the 2013 meeting as the 87-year-old monarch was curtailing long-distance travel. The Queen attended the 2015 summit in Malta and the 2018 summit (delayed by one year) in London, but was represented again by the Prince of Wales at the 2022 meeting (delayed by two years) in Rwanda.

The first CHOGM was held in 1971 in Singapore and there have been 27 held in total: the most recent was held in Apia, Samoa. They are held once every two years, although this pattern has occasionally been interrupted. They are held around the Commonwealth, rotating by invitation amongst its members.

In the past, CHOGMs have attempted to orchestrate common policies on certain contentious issues and current events, with a special focus on issues affecting member nations. CHOGMs have discussed the continuation of apartheid rule in South Africa and how to end it, military coups in Pakistan and Fiji, and allegations of electoral fraud in Zimbabwe. Sometimes the member states agree on a common idea or solution and release a joint statement declaring their opinion. More recently, beginning at the 1997 CHOGM, the meeting has had an official theme, set by the host nation, on which the primary discussions have been focused.

== History ==
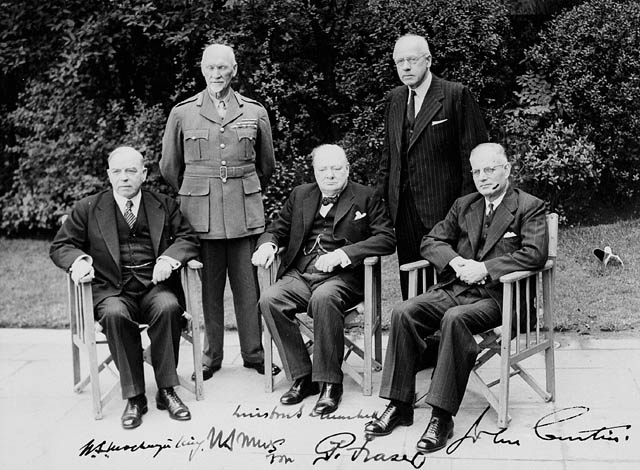
The heads of government of five members of the Commonwealth of Nations at the 1944 Commonwealth Prime Ministers' Conference.

The meetings originated with the leaders of the self-governing colonies of the British Empire. The First Colonial Conference in 1887 was followed by periodic meetings, known as Imperial Conferences from 1907, of government leaders of the Empire. The development of the independence of the dominions, and the creation of a number of new dominions, as well as the invitation of Southern Rhodesia (which also attended as a sui generis colony), changed the nature of the meetings. As the dominion leaders asserted themselves more and more at the meetings, it became clear that the time for 'imperial' conferences was over.

From the ashes of the Second World War, seventeen Commonwealth Prime Ministers' Conferences were held between 1944 and 1969. Of these, sixteen were held in London, reflecting then-prevailing views of the Commonwealth as the continuation of the Empire and the centralisation of power in the British Commonwealth Office (the one meeting outside London, in Lagos, was an extraordinary meeting held in January 1966 to co-ordinate policies towards Rhodesia). Two supplementary meetings were also held during this period: a Commonwealth Statesmen's meeting to discuss peace terms in April 1945, and a Commonwealth Economic Conference in 1952.

The 1960s saw an overhaul of the Commonwealth. The swift expansion of the Commonwealth after decolonisation saw the newly independent countries demand the creation of the Commonwealth Secretariat, and the United Kingdom, in response, successfully founding the Commonwealth Foundation. This decentralisation of power demanded a reformulation of the meetings. Instead of the meetings always being held in London, they would rotate across the membership, subject to countries' ability to host the meetings: beginning with Singapore in 1971. They were also renamed the 'Commonwealth Heads of Government Meetings' to reflect the growing diversity of the constitutional structures in the Commonwealth.

== Structure ==
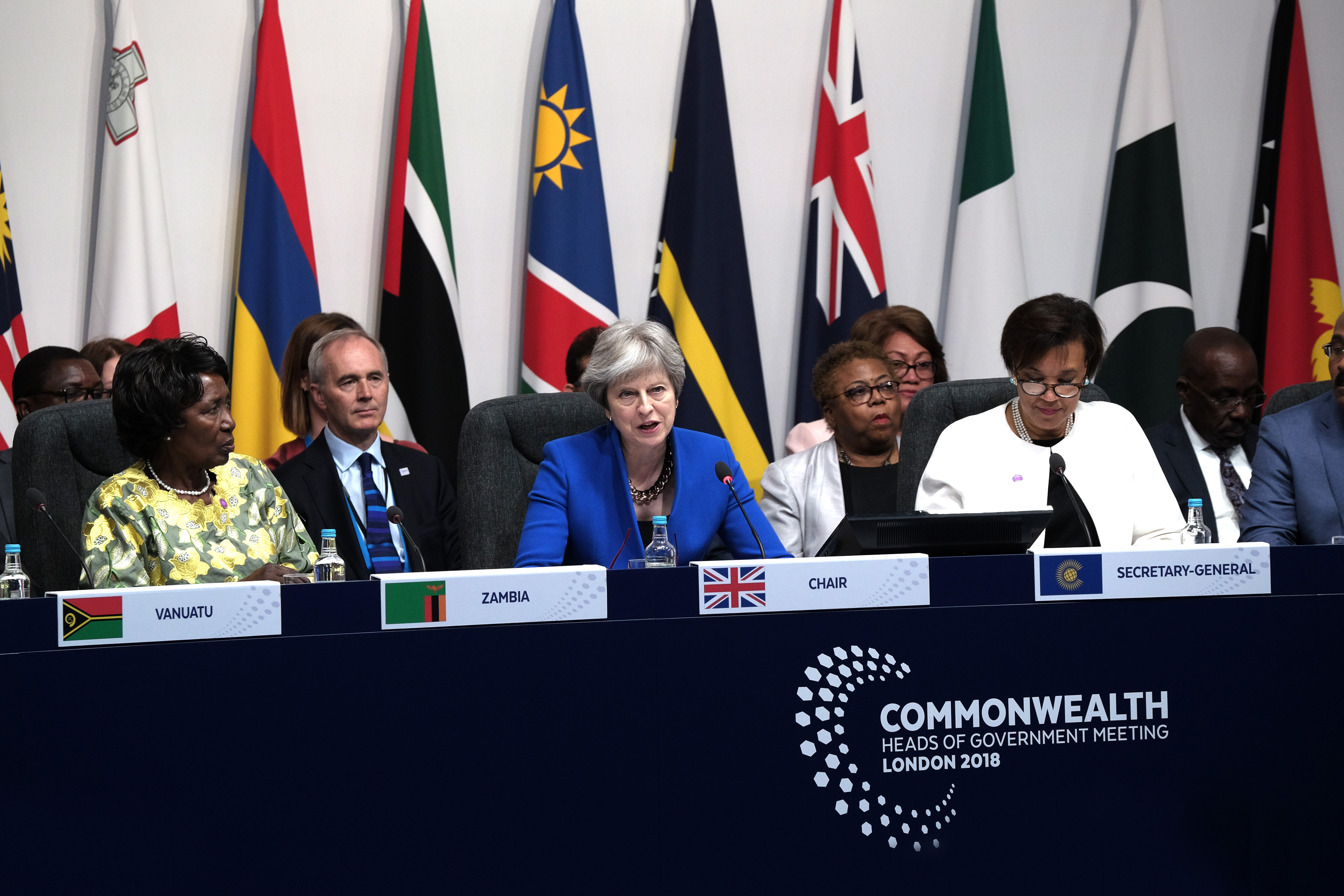
Theresa May chairs the 2018 session

The core of the CHOGM are the executive sessions, which are the formal gatherings of the heads of government to do business. However, the majority of the important decisions are held not in the main meetings themselves, but at the informal 'retreats': introduced at the second CHOGM, in Ottawa, by Prime Minister of Canada Pierre Trudeau, but reminiscent of the excursions to Chequers or Dorneywood in the days of the Prime Ministers' Conferences. Only the head of the delegation and their spouse and one additional person attend the retreats. The additional person may be of any capacity (personal, political, security, etc.) but only has occasional and intermittent access to the head of the delegation. It is usually at the retreat where, isolated from their advisers, the heads resolve the most intransigent issues: leading to the Gleneagles Agreement in 1977, the Lusaka Declaration in 1979, the Langkawi Declaration in 1989, the Millbrook Programme in 1995, the Aso Rock Declaration in 2003, and the Colombo Declaration on Sustainable, Inclusive and Equitable Development in 2013.

The 'fringe' of civil society organisations, including the Commonwealth Family and local groups, adds a cultural dimension to the event, and brings the CHOGM a higher media profile and greater acceptance by the local population. First officially recognised at Limassol in 1993, these events, spanning a longer period than the meeting itself, have, to an extent, preserved the length of the CHOGM: but only in the cultural sphere. Other meetings, such as those of the Commonwealth Ministerial Action Group, Commonwealth Business Council, and respective foreign ministers, have also dealt with business away from the heads of government themselves.

As the scope of the CHOGM has expanded beyond the meetings of the heads of governments themselves, the CHOGMs have become progressively shorter, and their business compacted into less time. The 1971 CHOGM lasted for nine days, and the 1977 and 1991 CHOGMs for seven days each. However, Harare's epochal CHOGM was the last to last a week; the 1993 CHOGM lasted for five days, and the contentious 1995 CHOGM for only three-and-a-half. The 2005 and subsequent conferences were held over two to two-and-a-half-days. However, recent CHOGMs have also featured several days of pre-summit Commonwealth Forums on business, women, youth, as well as the Commonwealth People's Forum and meetings of foreign ministers.

In October 2026, Politico reported that an internal British government review during Keir Starmer's ministry, commissioned following the 2024 summit, had proposed holding CHOGMs every four or five years instead of biennially, eliminating the final communiqué and leaders' retreat, and replacing alternate summits with investment conferences. The proposals followed disagreements over reparations for slavery at the 2024 meeting in Samoa. The British Foreign Office stated that the proposals did not represent government policy and that any changes would require agreement among Commonwealth members.

== Issues ==
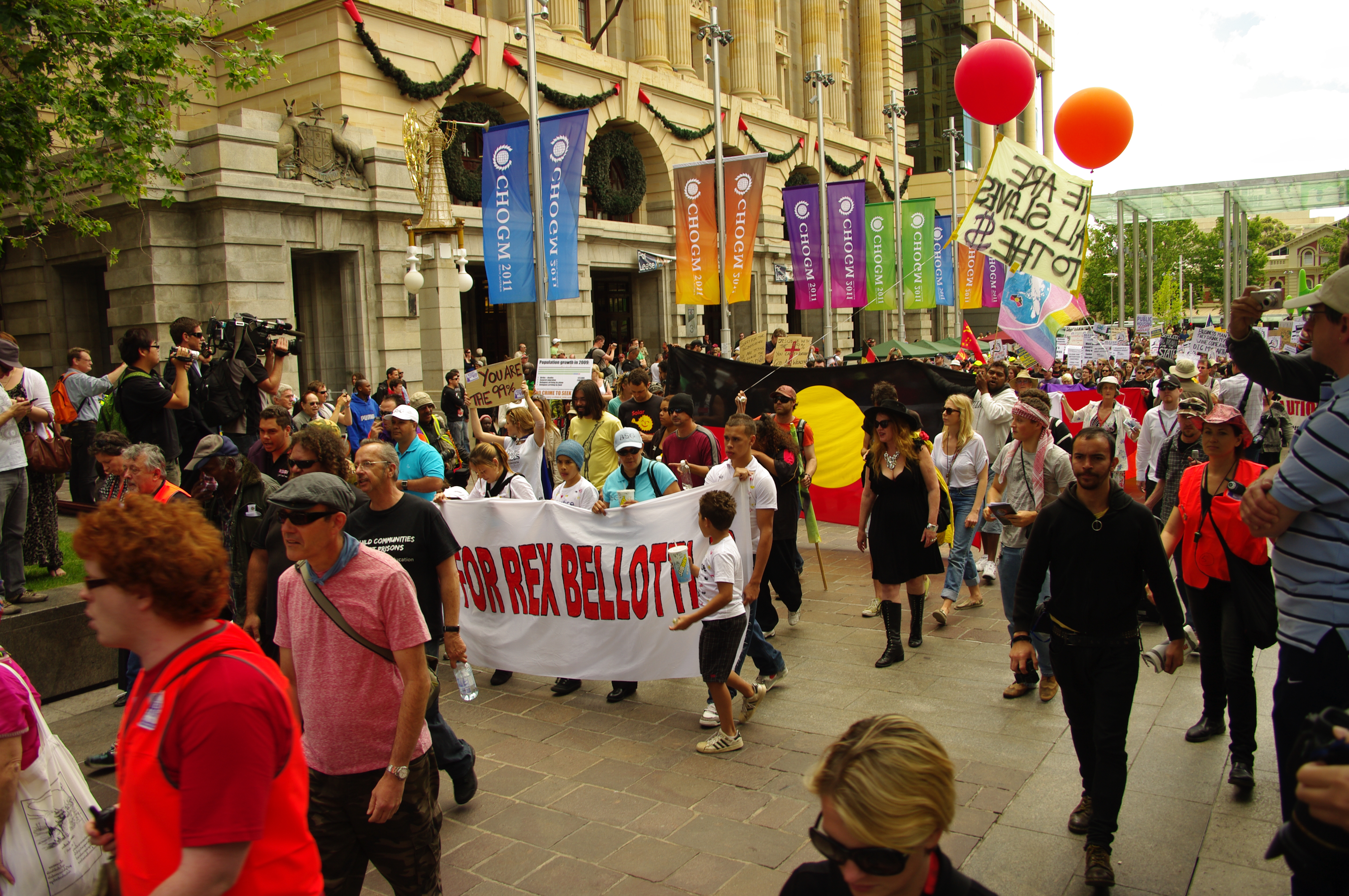
Protests during the 2011 CHOGM in Perth

During the 1980s, CHOGMs were dominated by calls for the Commonwealth to impose sanctions on South Africa to pressure the country to end apartheid. The division between Britain, during the government of Margaret Thatcher which resisted the call for sanctions and African Commonwealth countries, and the rest of the Commonwealth was intense at times and led to speculation that the organisation might collapse. According to one of Margaret Thatcher's former aides, Mrs. Thatcher, very privately, used to say that CHOGM stood for "Compulsory Handouts to Greedy Mendicants." According to his daughter, Denis Thatcher also referred to CHOGM as standing for 'Coons Holidaying on Government Money'.

In 2011, British Prime Minister David Cameron informed the British House of Commons that his proposals to reform the rules governing royal succession, a change which would require the approval of all sixteen Commonwealth realms, was approved at the 28–30 October CHOGM in Perth, subsequently referred to as the Perth Agreement.

Rwanda joined the Commonwealth in 2009 despite the Commonwealth Human Rights Initiative's (CHRI) finding that "the state of governance and human rights in Rwanda does not satisfy Commonwealth standards", and that it "does not therefore qualify for admission". Both the CHRI and Human Rights Watch have found that respect for democracy and human rights in Rwanda has declined since the country joined the Commonwealth. There have been calls for the Commonwealth to stand up for democracy and human rights in Rwanda at the 2022 CHOGM.

== Agenda ==
Under the Millbrook Commonwealth Action Programme, each CHOGM is responsible for renewing the remit of the Commonwealth Ministerial Action Group, whose responsibility it is to uphold the Harare Declaration on the core political principles of the Commonwealth.

== Incidents ==
A bomb exploded at the Sydney Hilton Hotel, the venue for the February 1978 Commonwealth Heads of Government Regional Meeting. Twelve foreign heads of government were staying in the hotel at the time. Most delegates were evacuated by Royal Australian Air Force helicopters and the meeting was moved to Bowral, protected by 800 soldiers of the Australian Army.

As the convocation of heads of governments and permanent Commonwealth staff and experts, CHOGMs are the highest institution of action in the Commonwealth, and rare occasions on which Commonwealth leaders all come together. CHOGMs have been the venues of many of the Commonwealth's most dramatic events. Robert Mugabe announced Zimbabwe's immediate withdrawal from the Commonwealth at the 2003 CHOGM, and Nigeria's execution of Ken Saro-Wiwa and eight others on the first day of the 1995 CHOGM led to that country's suspension.

It has also been the trigger of a number of events that have shaken participating countries domestically. The departure of Uganda's President Milton Obote to the 1971 CHOGM allowed Idi Amin to overthrow Obote's government. Similarly, President James Mancham's attendance of the 1977 CHOGM gave Prime Minister France-Albert René the opportunity to seize power in the Seychelles.

== Participating countries ==
=== Current member states ===
- Antigua and Barbuda
- Australia
- Bahamas
- Bangladesh
- Barbados
- Belize
- Brunei
- Cameroon
- Canada
- Cyprus
- Dominica
- Eswatini
- Fiji
- Gabon
- Gambia
- Grenada
- Guyana
- India
- Jamaica
- Kenya
- Kiribati
- Lesotho
- Malawi
- Malaysia
- Maldives
- Malta
- Mauritius
- Mozambique
- Namibia
- Nauru
- New Zealand
- Nigeria
- Pakistan
- Papua New Guinea
- Rwanda
- Saint Kitts and Nevis
- Saint Lucia
- Saint Vincent and the Grenadines
- Samoa
- Seychelles
- Sierra Leone
- Singapore
- Solomon Islands
- South Africa
- Sri Lanka
- Tanzania
- Togo
- Tonga
- Trinidad and Tobago
- Tuvalu
- Uganda
- United Kingdom
- Vanuatu
- Zambia

=== Former member states ===
- Zimbabwe (1980–2003)

== List of meetings ==
Year	Date	Country	City	Retreat	Chairperson	Secretary-General	Head of the Commonwealth
1971	14–22 January	Singapore	Singapore	None	Lee Kuan Yew	Arnold Smith	Elizabeth II
1973	2–10 August	Canada	Ottawa	Mont-Tremblant	Pierre Trudeau	Arnold Smith	Elizabeth II
1975	29 April – 6 May	Jamaica	Kingston	None	Michael Manley	Arnold Smith	Elizabeth II
1977	8–15 June	United Kingdom	London	Gleneagles Hotel	James Callaghan	Shridath Ramphal	Elizabeth II
1979	1–7 August	Zambia	Lusaka	Lusaka	Kenneth Kaunda	Shridath Ramphal	Elizabeth II
1981	30 September – 7 October	Australia	Melbourne	Canberra	Malcolm Fraser	Shridath Ramphal	Elizabeth II
1983	23–29 November	India	New Delhi	Goa	Indira Gandhi	Shridath Ramphal	Elizabeth II
1985	16–22 October	Bahamas	Nassau	Lyford Cay	Lynden Pindling	Shridath Ramphal	Elizabeth II
1986 *	3–5 August	United Kingdom	London	None	Margaret Thatcher	Shridath Ramphal	Elizabeth II
1987	13–17 October	Canada	Vancouver	Okanagan	Brian Mulroney	Shridath Ramphal	Elizabeth II
1989	18–24 October	Malaysia	Kuala Lumpur	Langkawi	Mahathir Mohamad	Shridath Ramphal	Elizabeth II
1991	16–21 October	Zimbabwe	Harare	Victoria Falls	Robert Mugabe	Emeka Anyaoku	Elizabeth II
1993	21–25 October	Cyprus	Limassol	None	Glafcos Clerides	Emeka Anyaoku	Elizabeth II
1995	10–13 November	New Zealand	Auckland	Millbrook	Jim Bolger	Emeka Anyaoku	Elizabeth II
1997	24–27 October	United Kingdom	Edinburgh	St Andrews	Tony Blair	Emeka Anyaoku	Elizabeth II
1999	12–14 November	South Africa	Durban	George	Thabo Mbeki	Emeka Anyaoku	Elizabeth II
2002	2–5 March	Australia	Coolum	None	John Howard	Don McKinnon	Elizabeth II
2003	5–8 December	Nigeria	Abuja	Aso Rock	Olusegun Obasanjo	Don McKinnon	Elizabeth II
2005	25–27 November	Malta	Valletta	Mellieħa	Lawrence Gonzi	Don McKinnon	Elizabeth II
2007	23–25 November	Uganda	Kampala	Munyonyo	Yoweri Museveni	Don McKinnon	Elizabeth II
2009	27–29 November	Trinidad and Tobago	Port of Spain	Port-of-Spain	Patrick Manning	Kamalesh Sharma	Elizabeth II
2011	28–30 October	Australia	Perth	Kings Park	Julia Gillard	Kamalesh Sharma	Elizabeth II
2013	15–17 November	Sri Lanka	Colombo	Sri Jayawardenepura Kotte	Mahinda Rajapaksa	Kamalesh Sharma	Elizabeth II
2015	27–29 November	Malta	Valletta; Mellieħa	Fort St Angelo	Joseph Muscat	Kamalesh Sharma	Elizabeth II
2018	19–20 April	United Kingdom	London, Windsor	Windsor Castle	Theresa May	Patricia Scotland	Elizabeth II
2022	24–25 June	Rwanda	Kigali	Kigali Convention Centre	Paul Kagame	Patricia Scotland	Elizabeth II
2023 *	5–6 May	United Kingdom	London	None	Rishi Sunak	Patricia Scotland	Charles III
2024	25–26 October	Samoa	Apia	Mulifanua	Fiamē Naomi Mataʻafa	Patricia Scotland	Charles III
2026	3–4 November	Antigua and Barbuda	St. John's	Jumby Bay Island	Gaston Browne	Shirley Ayorkor Botchwey	Charles III

*The 1986 and 2023 meetings were special sessions that fell outside the usual timetable. The 1986 CHOGM convened to discuss the issue of apartheid and only involved a handful of heads of government. The 2023 meeting (billed as 'Commonwealth Leaders' Summit') was an extraordinary session on the occasion of the coronation of King Charles III and consisted of a leaders meeting at Marlborough House and a reception at Buckingham Palace. Heads of State were also in attendance and the position of Chair-In-Office did not transfer to the prime minister of the United Kingdom. According to a statement issued by the Commonwealth Secretariat "After their meeting with the King, leaders from the Commonwealth's 56 member states then met privately to discuss issues of mutual interest, including initiatives to support the empowerment of young people, as this year has been designated the Commonwealth Year of Youth."

The 25th CHOGM was originally scheduled for Vanuatu in 2017 but the country rescinded its offer to host after Cyclone Pam devastated the country's infrastructure in March 2015. The meeting was rescheduled for the United Kingdom in the spring of 2018 which also resulted in the 26th CHOGM, originally scheduled for 2019, to be rescheduled for 22–27 June 2020. However, due to the coronavirus pandemic, the 26th CHOGM was again postponed to 2022.
