= Commonwealth Nurses and Midwives Federation (CNMF) =

- Formation: 1973
- Executive Director (Secretary) 1973-1994: Margaret Brayton
- Website: https://www.commonwealthnurses.org/

Commonwealth Nurses and Midwives Federation (CNMF) previously known as the Commonwealth Nurses Federation (CNF) (1973-) is an organisation representing nurses in nations which were once part of the British Commonwealth.

It is a non-governmental organisation of the secretariat of the Commonwealth of Nations. It is part of the Commonwealth Foundation Scheme, which encourages people to collaborate and create opportunities within the Commonwealth ideals.

== British Commonwealth and Empire Nurses’ War Memorial Fund ==
Prior to the founding of the CNF the main body was the British Commonwealth and Empire Nurses’ War Memorial Fund. This was launched by the Nursing Mirror in 1946 and also referred to as the British Empire Nurses Fund. Its Vice President was Edwina Mountbatten, Countess Mountbatten of Burma.

Its first objective was to establish a physical memorial, and in November 1950 Queen Elizabeth the Queen Mother opened the Commonwealth Nurses’ Memorial Chapel in Westminster Abbey, paid for by the British Commonwealth and Empire War Memorial Fund.

The Fund’s second objective was to provide post-graduate travelling scholarships for nurses and midwives of the British Commonwealth and Empire, by 1951 over £77,000 had been raised. Subsequent news items in the nursing press show regular awards were granted to nurses from across the Commonwealth. By February 1964, 148 awards had been granted and the fund granted its first research fellowship to Mrs BA Bennett, OBE. Bennett's research was to survey "some of the West Indian Islands, British Guiana and Bermuda of the general educational, nursing and social background of students... who come to the United Kingdom for basic post-certificate nurse training."

== Founding and history ==
On 20th & 28th June 1969 Sheila Quinn called together a 'Meeting of Representatives of Commonwealth Countries'. The meeting was held in Salon St Pierre and Salon La Salle, Place Bonaventure, Montreal, Canada and took place just before and after the 14th Quadrennial Congress of the International Council of Nurses (ICN). Quinn, who at the time was Director of the ICN, had been communicating with the Commonwealth Foundation (formed in 1965) and the meeting was established to consider the value of forming close links between national associations of the Commonwealth.

Funding for Commonwealth nurses to attend both the 1969 meeting and the ICN Congress was made available by the Commonwealth Foundation. This was followed up with funding for a Commonwealth Caribbean seminar where senior nurse leaders from across the Caribbean could meet 20-28 April 1970, in Barbados. Quinn and Helen Mussallem acted as consultants to the seminar.

A federation of commonwealth nursing associations was discussed at the 1969 meeting and by 1971 practical steps were being made towards this. The 'Commonwealth Nursing Federation' was created in 1973 with 25 member societies, with three years funding of £45,000 granted by the Commonwealth Foundation. CNF was one of 15 professional Commonwealth federations set up by the Foundation. By 1989 there were 53 main and 9 'corresponding' members.

CNF's first Secretary (Executive Director), Margaret Brayton,was appointed in 1973. Brayton remained in post until 1994. She was replaced in 1994 by Mrs Patricia Larby MBE, previously Librarian of the Institute of Commonwealth Studies. Barton remained in post until 2000 when she returned to librarianship and Mr Michael Stubbins became the new CNF Executive Director.

The CNF Newsletter originally appeared as a regular article in the Nursing Times, but later became independent.

The CNF promoted the profession of nursing through self sufficiency - enabling national and regional bodies to improve education, training and standards within individual countries. Two examples of this were the creation of the West African College of Nursing and the Regional College of Nursing for East, Central and Southern Africa.

1. The CNF helped establish the Provisional Council of the West African College of Nursing (WACN) on 5 April 1979. WACN was part of the West African Health Community (WAHC), which was established in May 1972 as Commonwealth Secretariat by the government of the Gambia, Ghana, Nigeria and Sierra Leone in co-operation with the Commonwealth Secretariat, London. By October 1980, WACN constitution had been ratified by the Assembly of Health Ministries in Accra Ghana. On 14 April 1981, the College was inaugurated in Banjul, The Gambia. In November 2000, The West African College of Nursing (WACN) became an agency of the West African Health Organisation (WAHO), when WAHC and merged with OCCGE (Organisation de Coordination et de Coopération pour la Lutte contre les Grandes Endémies / Organisation for Coordination and Cooperation in the Fight against Major Endemic Diseases) to form WAHO.
2. The CNF helped establish the Regional College of Nursing for East, Central and Southern Africa in 1990 as an agency of the then Commonwealth Regional Health Community Secretariat for East, Central and Southern Africa (CRHCS-ECSA). The Regional College later became known as the East, Central, and Southern Africa College of Nursing and Midwifery (ECSACONM) and as at 2026 reports into the CRHC-ECSA's successor body, the ECSA Health Community (ECSA HC). It covers 14 regional states.

In 2014 the CNF changed its name to the Commonwealth Nurses and Midwives Federation (CNMF).

In its early years the Commonwealth Foundation provided office space to the CNF, but later in its history the Royal College of Nursing provided accommodation for the CNF Executive Director in the international office at RCN headquarters in London.

== Structure ==
The CNMF has six regions:

1. Asia Region: Bangladesh, Brunei Darussalam, India, Malaysia, Maldives, Pakistan, Singapore and Sri Lanka
2. East, Central and Southern Africa Region: Botswana, Kenya, Eswatini, Lesotho, Malawi, Mauritius, Mozambique, Namibia, Rwanda, Seychelles, South Africa, Uganda, Tanzania, and Zambia
3. West Africa Region: Cameroon, The Gambia, Ghana, Nigeria, and Sierra Leone
4. Pacific Region: Australia, Fiji, Kiribati, Nauru, New Zealand, Papua New Guinea, Samoa, Solomon Islands, Tonga, Tuvalu, Vanuatu
5. Atlantic Region: Antigua and Barbuda, The Bahamas, Barbados, Belize, Canada, Dominica, Grenada, Guyana, Jamaica, Saint Lucia, Saint Kitts and Nevis, Saint Vincent and the Grenadines, and Trinidad and Tobago
6. Europe Region: Cyprus, Malta and the United Kingdom

The CNMF is managed by an elected Board, which consists of a President, a Vice-President, and a member from each of its six regions. The Federation has two appointed officers - an Executive Secretary and a Treasurer. Board Meetings and General Meetings are held every two years.

The CNMF is in regular contact with the Commonwealth Secretariat and the Commonwealth Foundation. The CNMF is an accredited Commonwealth body, which allows involvement in annual Health Ministers' meetings, the biennial Commonwealth Peoples Forum held prior to the Commonwealth Heads of Government meeting and other Commonwealth meetings such as the civil society consultations.

== See also ==
- Commonwealth of Nations
- Commonwealth Foundation
- List of Commonwealth organisations
