= List of Commonwealth organisations =

Network of NGOs affiliated with the Commonwealth of Nations

A Commonwealth organisation is an organisation affiliated with the Commonwealth of Nations. This article is a list of such organisations, which include societies, institutions, associations, organisations, funds and charities that support the Commonwealth.

In some cases, such as Sight Savers International and the English-Speaking Union, they also operate outside the Commonwealth, though their operations began and largely remain within.

== List of organisations ==
The following organisations are affiliated with the Commonwealth, as of July 2025:

- Commonwealth Foundation
- Commonwealth Secretariat
- Commonwealth of Learning
- Commonwealth Association of Tax Administrators
- Conference of Commonwealth Meteorologists
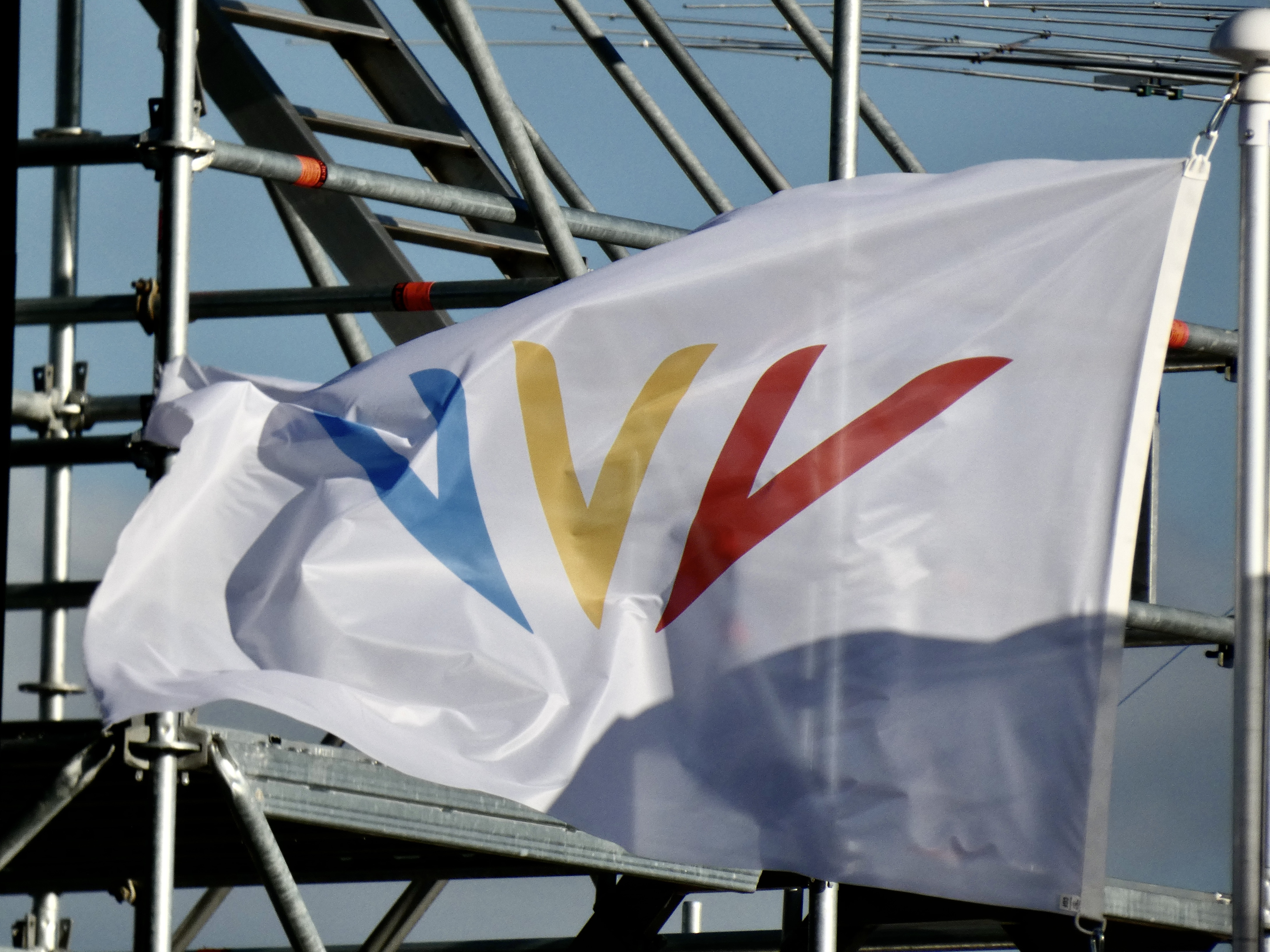
  Flag of the Commonwealth Games Federation
- Commonwealth Games Federation
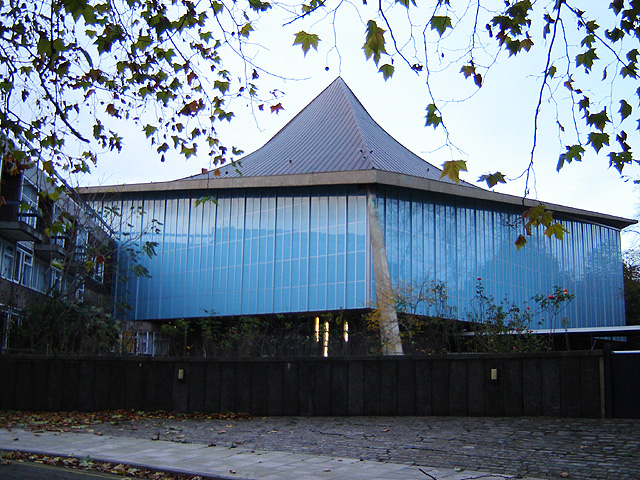
  The Commonwealth Institute building in Kensington, headquarters of the Commonwealth Education Trust
- Commonwealth Local Government Forum
- Commonwealth Parliamentary Association
- Commonwealth Telecommunications Organisation
- Commonwealth War Graves Commission
- African Centre for Democracy and Human Rights Studies
- Association of Commonwealth Literature and Language Studies
- Association of Commonwealth Universities
- Association of Commonwealth Leaders’ Conferences
- Association of International Accountants
- Chartered Insurance Institute
- Commission on Science and Technology for Sustainable Development in the South
- Common Age
- Commonwealth Association for Health and Disability
- Commonwealth Association of Legislative Counsel
- Commonwealth Association of Architects
- Commonwealth Association of Law Reform Agencies
- Commonwealth Association of Museums
- Commonwealth Association of Paediatrics Gastroenterology and Nutrition
- Commonwealth Association of Planners
- Commonwealth Association of Public Accounts Committees
- Commonwealth Association of Science, Technology and Mathematics Educators
- Commonwealth Association of Surveying and Land Economy
- Commonwealth Boxing Council
- Commonwealth Businesswomen’s Network
- Commonwealth Consortium for Education
- Commonwealth Council for Education Administration and Management
- Commonwealth Countries League
- Commonwealth Dental Association
- Commonwealth Disabled People’s Forum
- Commonwealth Equality Network
- Commonwealth Engineers Council
- Commonwealth Enterprise and Investment Council
- Commonwealth Fashion Council
- Commonwealth Forestry Association
- Commonwealth Geographical Bureau
- Commonwealth Girls Education Fund
- Commonwealth Heritage Forum
- Commonwealth HIV/AIDS Action Group
- Commonwealth Human Ecology Council
- Commonwealth Human Rights Initiative
- Commonwealth Jewish Council
- Commonwealth Journalists’ Association
- Commonwealth Judicial Education Institute
- Commonwealth Lawyers Association
- Commonwealth Legal Education Association
- Commonwealth Magistrates’ and Judges’ Association
- Commonwealth Medical Association
- Commonwealth Medical Trust
- Commonwealth Nurses and Midwives Federation
- Commonwealth Organisation for Social Work
- Commonwealth Pharmacists Association
- Commonwealth Trade Union Group
- Commonwealth Resounds
- Commonwealth Veterinary Association
- Commonwealth Women’s Network
- Corona Worldwide
- Heartfulness Institute
- Lawyers Without Borders
- Malaria No More UK
- Royal Life Saving Society
- Royal Overseas League
- SightSavers International
- Soroptimist International
- Sustainable Development Policy Institute
- The Commonwealth Association
- The Duke of Edinburgh’s International Award Foundation
- The Institute of Certified Bookkeepers
- The Round Table
- The Royal Commonwealth Society
- The Queen’s Commonwealth Trust
- Towards Zero Foundation
- Women Mediators across the Commonwealth
- World Alliance for Citizen Participation CIVICUS
- Zalmi Foundation

== Defunct organisations ==
The following now-defunct organisations were affiliated with the Commonwealth:

- British Empire and Commonwealth Museum
- Commonwealth Policy Studies Unit (CPSU)
- Commonwealth Press Union
- Commonwealth Business Council
- Commonwealth Education Trust
