= 1973 Commonwealth Heads of Government Meeting =

2nd Commonwealth Heads of Government Meeting
- Host country: Canada
- Dates: 2–10 August 1973
- Cities: Ottawa
- Venues: Mont-Tremblant
- Participants: 33 (of 33 members)
- Heads of State or Government: 24
- Chair: Pierre Trudeau (Prime Minister)
- Follows: 1971
- Precedes: 1975

Key points
- Commonwealth Youth Programme; Nuclear weapons testing Rhodesia; International trade European Economic Community relations with the developing world

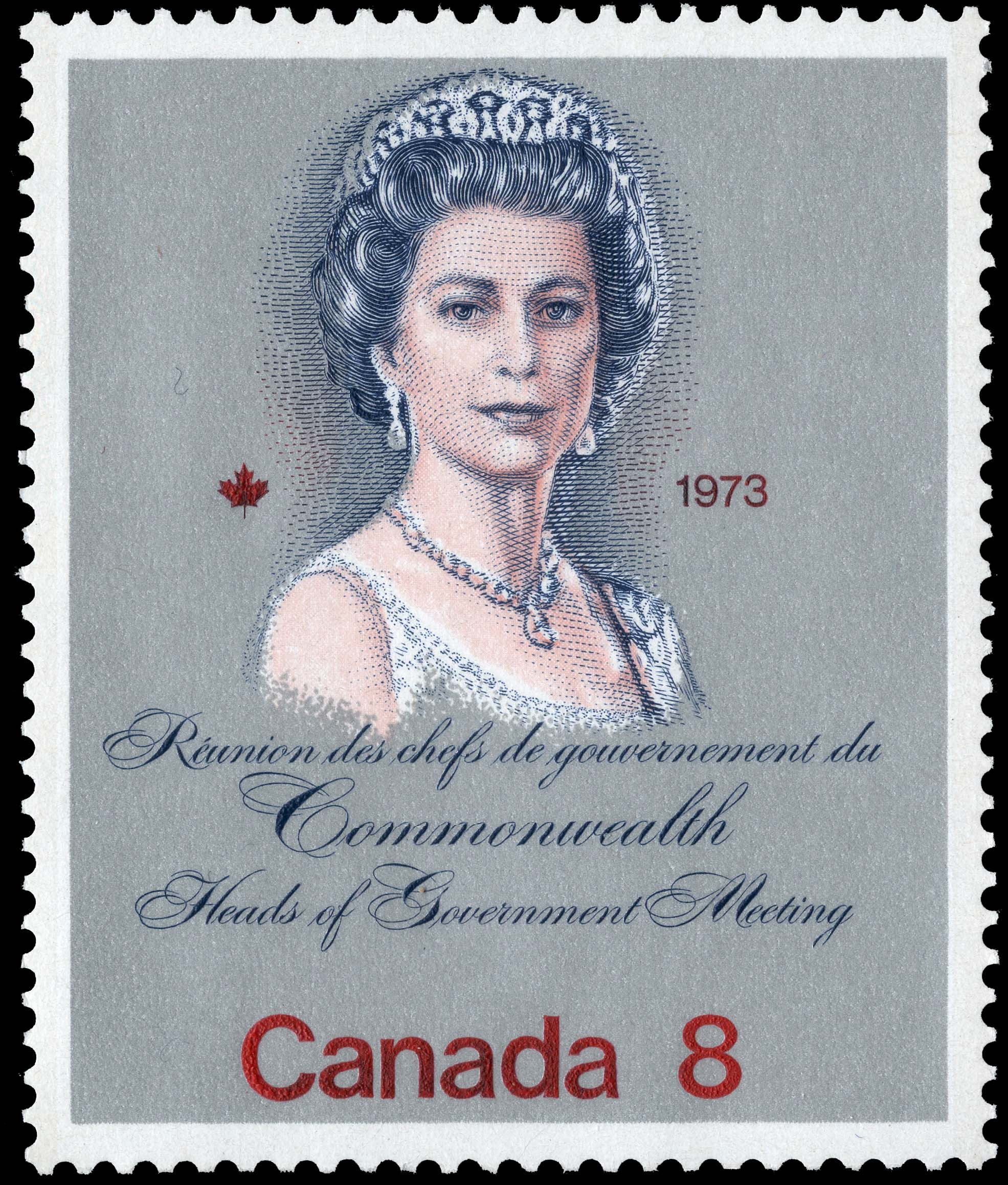
Canadian postage stamp commemorating the 1973 Commonwealth Heads of Government meeting

The 1973 Commonwealth Heads of Government Meeting, officially known as the II Commonwealth Heads Meeting, and commonly known as Ottawa 1973, was the second Meeting of the Heads of Government of the Commonwealth of Nations. It was held from 2 to 10 August 1973 in Ottawa, hosted by Canadian Prime Minister Pierre Trudeau. It was the first meeting to be attended by the Head of the Commonwealth Elizabeth II.

The summit issued a statement on nuclear weapon tests that affirmed "the unfailing support of Commonwealth governments for the international Treaty banning nuclear weapon tests in the atmosphere, in outer space and under water. It appeals, furthermore, to the international community for a total ban on nuclear weapon tests in any environment." Other topics included changing relationships among United States, the Soviet Union and the People's Republic of China, regional security, disarmament, the situation in the Middle East and South East Asia (i.e., the Vietnam War), the proposed creation of a peace zone in the Indian Ocean and the situation in Southern Africa and in particular Rhodesia's white minority ruled government. Also discussed were the desirability of a worldwide expansion of trade through the General Agreement on Tariffs and Trade and negotiations between the European Economic Community and developing countries.

Besides the policy topics discussed, the conference saw a number of incidental, but lasting, innovations that helped define the work of the Commonwealth. The leaders held a private session in Mont-Tremblant, beginning the tradition of the 'retreat', whereby, in addition to the executive sessions, the heads of government leave the host city, taking only their spouses and one advisor each, to be isolated from outside influences and to discuss on less formal terms.

The Commonwealth flag emerged from pennants that were designed to be displayed on the leaders' cars in Ottawa. Designed by Trudeau and Commonwealth Secretary-General Arnold Smith (a fellow Canadian), the flag was officially adopted three years later, on 26 March 1976. The Royal Commonwealth Society petitioned the conference to discuss creating a uniformly-observed Commonwealth Day, which would eventually be discussed, at the proposal of the Canadian delegation, at the 1975 Meeting, and the Canadian proposals adopted.

Queen Elizabeth did not attend the first conference in 1971, and was advised against attending the 1973 conference by British prime minister Edward Heath. Elizabeth II did attend the 1973 conference on the advice of Prime Minister Trudeau. She would attend all subsequent meetings until absenting herself in 2013 when she began to refrain from long distance travel.

This was the first meeting in which the Bahamas and Bangladesh participated.

== Participants ==
The following nations were represented:

Nation	Name	Position
Canada	Pierre Trudeau (Chairman)	Prime Minister
Australia	Gough Whitlam	Prime Minister
Bahamas	Lynden Pindling	Prime Minister
Bangladesh	Sheikh Mujibur Rahman	Prime Minister
Barbados	Errol Barrow	Prime Minister
Botswana	Sir Seretse Khama	President
Cyprus	Ioannis Christophides	Minister of Foreign Affairs
Fiji	Sir Kamisese Mara	Prime Minister
The Gambia	Assan Musa Camara	Vice President
Ghana	Napoleon Ashley-Lassen	Member of the National Redemption Council and Chief of Defence Staff
Guyana	Forbes Burnham	Prime Minister
India	Swaran Singh	Minister of External Affairs
Jamaica	Michael Manley	Prime Minister
Kenya	Daniel arap Moi	Vice President
Lesotho	Leabua Jonathan	Prime Minister
Malawi	John Msonthi	Minister of Education
Malaysia	Abdul Razak Hussein	Prime Minister
Malta	Dom Mintoff	Prime Minister
Mauritius	Sir Seewoosagur Ramgoolam	Prime Minister
New Zealand	Norman Kirk	Prime Minister
Nigeria	Yakubu Gowon	Head of the Federal Military Government and Commander-in-Chief
Sierra Leone	Siaka Stevens	President
Sri Lanka	Sirimavo Bandaranaike	Prime Minister
Singapore	Lee Kuan Yew	Prime Minister
Swaziland	Makhosini Dlamini	Prime Minister
Tanzania	Julius Nyerere	President
Tonga	Fatafehi Tuʻipelehake	Prime Minister
Trinidad and Tobago	Francis Prevatt	Minister of Petroleum and Mines
Uganda	Paul Etiang	Acting Minister of Foreign Affairs
United Kingdom	Edward Heath	Prime Minister
Western Samoa	Fiamē Mataʻafa Faumuina Mulinuʻu II	Prime Minister
Zambia	Mainza Chona	Vice-President
