= Alex Sceberras Trigona =

Maltese politician and university teacher

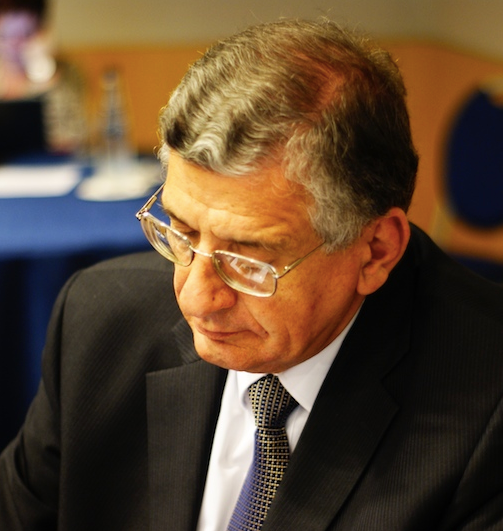

Special Envoy to the Prime Minister of Malta
- Incumbent
- Assumed office 9 March 2013
- Prime Minister: Joseph Muscat

Personal details
- Born: 3 March 1950 (age 76) Sliema, Malta
- Party: Labour Party
- Spouse: Johanna nee Borg
- Children: 2
- Education: University of Malta

Alex Sceberras Trigona is a Maltese politician and diplomat. He is a Special Envoy to the Prime Minister of Malta, and the Permanent Representative of the Republic of Malta to the World Trade Organization. He served as Malta's Minister for Foreign Affairs from 1981 to 1987.

== Early life ==
=== Education ===
Sceberras Trigona was educated at the Lyceum, Malta, and the University of Malta, where he obtained his notarial diploma in 1972, and graduated Doctor of Laws in 1973. His Doctoral thesis was on Constitutional Change and the Maltese Constitution.

== Career ==
He is a Visiting Senior Lecturer at the University of Malta where he lectures on Private International Law at the Faculty of Laws, and on Further Studies in Diplomacy and Legal Dimensions of Humanitarian Action at the Faculty of Arts.

He has practiced law in Malta as a Notary Public since 1976.

== Foreign Affairs ==
Sceberras Trigona was Minister for Foreign Affairs from 1981 to 1987.

== See also ==
- List of current foreign ministers
