= 1975 Commonwealth Heads of Government Meeting =

3rd Commonwealth Heads of Government Meeting
- Host country: Jamaica
- Dates: 29 April–6 May 1975
- Cities: Kingston
- Participants: 33
- Heads of State or Government: 28
- Chair: Michael Manley (Prime Minister)
- Follows: 1973
- Precedes: 1977

Key points
- Commonwealth Day; Disarmament; Economic issues Southern Africa; Disarmament; Cyprus dispute, Bangladesh Liberation War

The 1975 Commonwealth Heads of Government Meeting, officially known as the III Commonwealth Heads Meeting, and commonly known as Kingston 1975, was the third Meeting of the Heads of Government of the Commonwealth of Nations. It was held from 29 April to 6 May 1975 in Kingston, Jamaica, and was hosted by Jamaican Prime Minister Michael Manley.

Among the topics discussed were nuclear disarmament, the situation in Rhodesia and South Africa, decolonization in Southern Africa, the Turkish invasion and occupation of northern Cyprus, the end of the Vietnam War, the aftermath of the war between Bangladesh and Pakistan and other regional issues.

This was the first meeting in which Grenada participated.

== Participants ==
The following nations were represented:

Nation	Name	Position
Jamaica	Michael Manley (Chairman)	Prime Minister
Australia	Gough Whitlam	Prime Minister
Bahamas	Lynden Pindling	Prime Minister
Bangladesh	Sheikh Mujibur Rahman	President
Barbados	Errol Barrow	Prime Minister
Botswana	Sir Seretse Khama	President
Canada	Pierre Trudeau	Prime Minister
Cyprus	Makarios III	President
Fiji	Sir Kamisese Mara	Prime Minister
The Gambia	Sir Dawda Jawara	President
Ghana	Kwame Baah	Commissioner for Foreign Affairs
Grenada	Eric Gairy	Prime Minister
Guyana	Forbes Burnham	Prime Minister
India	Indira Gandhi	Prime Minister
Kenya	Daniel arap Moi	Vice President
Lesotho	Leabua Jonathan	Prime Minister
Malawi	Dick Matenje	Minister of Finance
Malaysia	Abdul Razak Hussein	Prime Minister
Malta	Dom Mintoff	Prime Minister
Mauritius	Sir Seewoosagur Ramgoolam	Prime Minister
New Zealand	Bill Rowling	Prime Minister
Nigeria	Yakubu Gowon	Head of the Federal Military Government
Sierra Leone	Siaka Stevens	President
Sri Lanka	Sirimavo Bandaranaike	Prime Minister
Singapore	Lee Kuan Yew	Prime Minister
Swaziland	Makhosini Dlamini	Prime Minister
Tanzania	Julius Nyerere	President
Tonga	Fatafehi Tuʻipelehake	Prime Minister
Trinidad and Tobago	Kamaluddin Mohammed	Minister of Health and Leader of the House of Representatives
Uganda	Khalid Younis Kinene	Permanent Representative to the UN
United Kingdom	Harold Wilson	Prime Minister
Western Samoa	Fiamē Mataʻafa Faumuina Mulinuʻu II	Prime Minister
Zambia	Kenneth Kaunda	President
