= List of Commonwealth heads of government =

The Commonwealth Heads of Government (CHOG) is the collective name for the government leaders of the nations with membership in the Commonwealth of Nations. They are invited to attend Commonwealth Heads of Government Meetings every two years, with most countries being represented by either their head of government or head of state.

== List of current heads ==
Commonwealth member	Head of government	Current holder	Since	Portrait	Ref
Antigua and Barbuda	Prime Minister	Gaston Browne	13 June 2014		
Australia	Prime Minister	Anthony Albanese	23 May 2022		
The Bahamas	Prime Minister	Philip Davis	17 September 2021		
Bangladesh	Prime Minister	Tarique Rahman	17 February 2026		
Barbados	Prime Minister	Mia Mottley	25 May 2018		
Belize	Prime Minister	Johnny Briceño	12 November 2020		
Botswana	President	Duma Boko	1 November 2024		
Brunei	Sultan and Prime Minister	Hassanal Bolkiah	1 January 1984		
Cameroon	President	Paul Biya	6 November 1982		
Canada	Prime Minister	Mark Carney	14 March 2025		
Cyprus	President	Nikos Christodoulides	28 February 2023		
Dominica	Prime Minister	Roosevelt Skerrit	8 January 2004		
Eswatini	Prime Minister	Russell Dlamini	3 November 2023		
Fiji	Prime Minister	Sitiveni Rabuka	24 December 2022		
Gabon	President	Brice Oligui Nguema	3 May 2025		
The Gambia	President	Adama Barrow	17 January 2017		
Ghana	President	John Mahama	7 January 2025		
Grenada	Prime Minister	Dickon Mitchell	24 June 2022		
Guyana	President	Irfaan Ali	2 August 2020		
India	Prime Minister	Narendra Modi	26 May 2014		
Jamaica	Prime Minister	Andrew Holness	3 March 2016		
Kenya	President	William Ruto	13 September 2022		
Kiribati	President	Taneti Maamau	11 March 2016		
Lesotho	Prime Minister	Sam Matekane	28 October 2022		
Malawi	President	Peter Mutharika	4 October 2025		
Malaysia	Prime Minister	Anwar Ibrahim	24 November 2022		
Maldives	President	Mohamed Muizzu	17 November 2023		
Malta	Prime Minister	Robert Abela	13 January 2020		
Mauritius	Prime Minister	Navin Ramgoolam	12 November 2024		
Mozambique	President	Daniel Chapo	15 January 2025		
Namibia	President	Netumbo Nandi-Ndaitwah	21 March 2025		
Nauru	President	David Adeang	30 October 2023		
New Zealand	Prime Minister	Christopher Luxon	27 November 2023		
Nigeria	President	Bola Tinubu	29 May 2023		
Pakistan	Prime Minister	Shehbaz Sharif	4 March 2024		
Papua New Guinea	Prime Minister	James Marape	30 May 2019		
Rwanda	President	Paul Kagame	22 April 2000		
Saint Kitts and Nevis	Prime Minister	Terrance Drew	6 August 2022		
Saint Lucia	Prime Minister	Philip J. Pierre	27 July 2021		
Saint Vincent and the Grenadines	Prime Minister	Godwin Friday	28 November 2025		
Samoa	Prime Minister	Laʻauli Leuatea Schmidt	16 September 2025		
Seychelles	President	Patrick Herminie	26 October 2025		
Sierra Leone	President	Julius Maada Bio	4 April 2018		
Singapore	Prime Minister	Lawrence Wong	15 May 2024		
Solomon Islands	Prime Minister	Matthew Wale	15 May 2026		
South Africa	President	Cyril Ramaphosa	14 February 2018		
Sri Lanka	President	Anura Kumara Dissanayake	23 September 2024		
Tanzania	President	Samia Suluhu Hassan	19 March 2021		
Togo	Prime Minister	Faure Gnassingbé	3 May 2025		
Tonga	Prime Minister	Fatafehi Fakafānua	18 December 2025		
Trinidad and Tobago	Prime Minister	Kamla Persad-Bissessar	1 May 2025		
Tuvalu	Prime Minister	Feleti Teo	26 February 2024		
Uganda	President	Yoweri Museveni	29 January 1986		
United Kingdom	Prime Minister	Andy Burnham	20 July 2026		
Vanuatu	Prime Minister	Jotham Napat	11 February 2025		
Zambia	President	Hakainde Hichilema	24 August 2021		

== See also ==
- Commonwealth Heads of Government Meeting
- List of current viceregal representatives of the Crown
- List of prime ministers of Charles III
- List of governors-general of Charles III
- List of Privy Counsellors (2022–present)
