= Velma Owusu-Bempah =

Ghanaian milliner

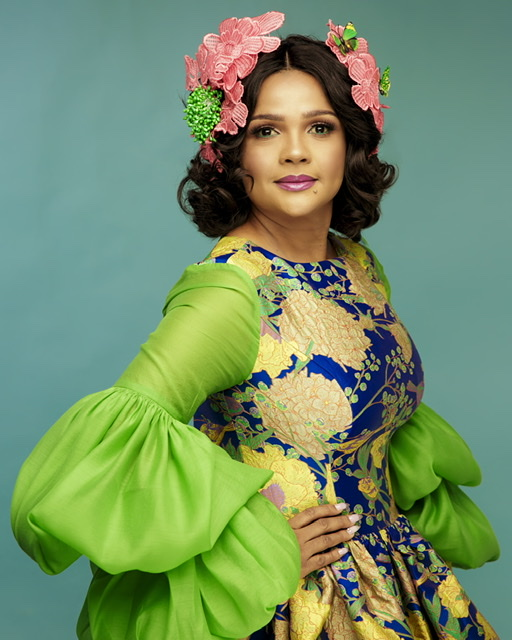
- Born: Velma Crossland; 13 January 1981 (age 44); Ghana
- Education: St. Mary Senior High School
- Alma mater: University of Ghana
- Occupation: Milliner
- Years active: 2005-present
- Parents: Prof Leonard Brighton Crossland (father); Mrs Sarah Crossland (mother)
- Relatives: Ophelia Crossland

Velma Owusu-Bempah (born Velma Crossland; January 13, 1981) is a milliner, accessories designer and fashion instructor from Ghana. She is the Creative director of her self-named fashion brand, Velma's Millinery and Accessories, and the principal of Velma's Millinery Academy.

== Early life and education ==
Owusu-Bempah is the daughter of Ghanaian archeologist and academician Leonard Brighton Crossland and his wife Mrs. Sarah Crossland. Velma started her formative years in Accra with her grandmother, parents and other siblings including her younger sister, fashion designer, Ophelia Crossland.

She attended the St Mary's Senior High School in Korle Gonno, Ghana, and later enrolled into the University of Ghana Business School to study marketing.

After completing her University education, Owusu-Bempah joined her mother, a Ghanaian fabric merchant and industrialist in her business. She was later advised by her mother to pursue her passion in millinery and accessories. Owusu-Bempah was admitted to the Central Saint Martins College of Arts and Designs, an affiliation of London College of Fashion, where she studied Millinery, Bag designing and Communication.

== Career ==
In 2005, Owusu-Bempah established her eponymous brand as a hats and accessories designer which has seen her making pieces for notable personalities in Ghana and beyond. Ghana's First Lady, Rebecca Akufo-Addo, Senator Florence Ita Giwa, Second Lady of Ghana, Samira Bawumia, Nicole Ari Parker, Anita Erskine, Sandra Ankobiah, Juliet Ibrahim, Shirley Frimpong- Manso, Joselyn Dumas, Kofi Okyere Darko, mother of Beyonce, Tina Knowles Lawson, and many others are considered part of her high-profile clientele.

Her designs were showcased at the London Great Hat Exhibition in 2018. She also collaborated with her sister Ophelia Crossland at the Swarovski Expose in Dubai by making a matching ensemble for the outfit. Her brand has also collaborated with several other designers and brands including Christie Brown, Tiffany Amber, Nineteen 57 By KOD, Gilbert Asante and Abrantie the Gentleman.

During the visit of Charles, Prince of Wales and the Duchess of Cornwall to Ghana, Owusu-Bempah was made the official accessory designer for the fashion show and banquet held in their honor.

In 2018, she launched her fashion academy, Velma's Millinery Academy to train young and upcoming milliners in Ghana.

Owusu-Bempah was among the creatives who collaborated on the "Remember Me" project by Ghanaian photographer, Francis Kokoroko, Rania Odaymat, and The Fair Justice Initiative. The project highlighted twelve Ghanaian women who have been sentenced to life in prison at the Nsawam Prisons. Her headpieces were used as part of props that were used to replace the prison outfits. Their portraits were exhibited at the Make Be exhibition at La Maison in October 2018 with a coffee book published to help create funds for inmates. She is currently a tutor at the Nsawam Medium Security Prison where she offers courses in hat-making for prison inmates as part of the Fair Justice Millinery Initiative.

She mentions Rachel Trevor Morgan as a milliner that inspires her greatly.

== Awards and Recognitions ==
Accessories designer of the Year, Glitz Style Awards 2018

Ghana's Most Outstanding Woman 2019 (GOWA)

== Notable Mentions ==
Velma was featured on Vogue Italia along with sister, Ophelia Crossland and Nigerian designer, Torlowei for training young girls popularly known as Kayayei in fashion.
