= Debonair Afrik =

Ghanaian fashion magazine and online blog

- Editor: Nuel Bans
- Categories: Fashion lifestyle
- Frequency: Monthly
- Founder: Emmanuel Ekuban
- Country: Ghana
- Based in: Accra
- Language: English
- Website: www.debonairafrik.com

Debonair Afrik (stylised as debonairafrik) is a Ghanaian based digital media publication covering fashion, lifestyle, publishing, and current events. It was founded in 2015 by Emmanuel Ekuban (Nuel Bans), as a neo-Africanism publication. It is a popular online news portal for Ghanaians and widely acknowledged by the Sub-Saharan region.

== History ==
Debonair Afrik was founded by fashion writer Nuel Bans in 2015 while studying at Alliance française D'Accra. It began as a digital fashion magazine and later expanded into several fields in the creative industry. The publication covers fashion news on the continent and is targeted at professionals and young people. Coverage is intended to provide a neo-African lens to subjects including designers, models, stylist photographer, makeup artists, celebrities and industry trends. During its early days, the platform concentrated on curating content and publishing magazine articles; later it established an editorial and creative arm to produce original content.

== Style Lounge ==
The magazine also founded Style Lounge Platform and the Style Lounge Weekend Initiative, two platforms to introduce up-and-coming fashion talents to industry leaders using various fashion shows, trade events and workshops. Several fashion insiders including Aisha Ayensu of Christie Brown, Empress Jamilla and Sandra Alexandrina Don-Arthur have been guest panellists on the show.

In an interview with Afropunk, Debonair Afrik editor, Nuel Bans stated "Style Lounge seeks to disseminate knowledge, both practical and theory to everyone and to foster healthy relationships among designers, models and everyone at large.

Vogue Italia called the fashion show "a thrilling and exciting experience for sustainable fashion"

== Recognition and achievements ==
- Avance Media names Debonair Afrik Editor in Top 50 Ghanaian Bloggers
- Young Achievers Awards select Nuel Bans as Panelist and Young Entrepreneur
- Panelist at Accra Mall Fashion Future Fund Empowerment Summit
- Nominated for Glitz Style Awards "Blogger of the Year" Category.
- Editor of DebonairAfrik named as Global Fashion Exchange Ambassador
- Debonair Afrik is producer for Christie Brown's F/W 2020 virtual launch
