= Gilbert Asante =

Ghanaian photographer (born 1987)

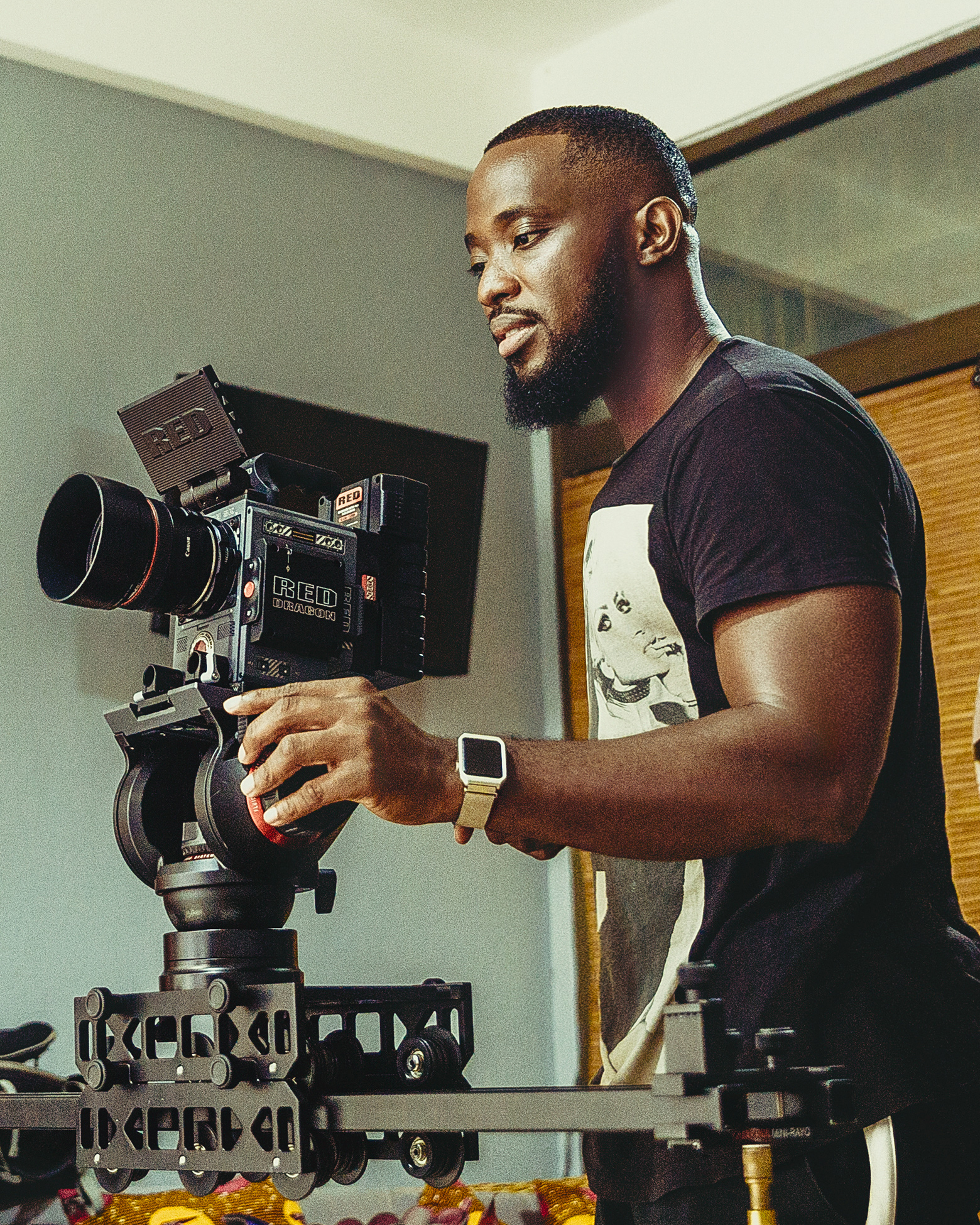
- Born: 14 June 1987 (age 39); Koforidua, Ghana
- Education: St. Peter's Boys Senior High School; Ghana Communications Technology University
- Occupations: Photographer; Creative director; Multidisciplinary artist

Gilbert Asante (born 14 June 1987) is a Ghanaian creative director, photographer, and a multidisciplinary artist. He is best known for his viral images of Ghanaian celebrities including Joselyn Dumas, Boxing legend Azumah Nelson, Lydia Forson, and Big Brother Nigeria Housemate, Nengi.

== Early life ==
Born on 14 June 1987, Gilbert Asante was raised in Koforidua, Ghana, and attended the St. Peter's Boys Senior High School in Nkwatia for his secondary education. He was later awarded a degree in Telecommunication Engineering from the Ghana Communications Technology University.

Asante's passion for the arts begun at the age of 19 while on a trip to Japanese art centres. On his return to Ghana, he experimented with web and graphic design until he made his transition into fashion and commercial photography six years later.

In an interview with Peace Hyde for Forbes, Asante told the platform how he began his career stating that "photography wasn’t a big thing as it is now. So, I would design a website with my team for a restaurant and the images [will be] terrible so it [would end] up making the website [look] very tacky. So that is what pushed me to invest in a camera. I just needed some decent photos."

== Career ==
Gilbert is the creative lead and co-owner for a digital production company, Laceup Media.

He has documented various subjects from the former First Lady Ghana and first female presidential candidate, Mrs Nana Konadu Agyeman Rawlings for her memoir to celebrities including Omotola Jalade,DJ Cuppy, Lydia Forson, Big Brother Nigeria Housemate, Nengi Rebecca Hampson, Joselyn Dumas, Boris Kudjoe, Alexandrina Sandra Don-Arthur, historian Nana OforiAtta Ayim and Jackie Appiah as well as models he has worked with.

Asante has worked with a number of corporate and fashion brands including Nestle, Vodafone Ghana, Guinness, Ernest Chemist, Martell, Meridian Port Services (MPS), Ophelia Crossland, and Velma Owusu-Bempah.

He has also been featured in international and local publications including Coveteur, Glitz Africa, Canoe Magazine, New African Woman, EMY Magazine, Shick Magazine, GQ, and Glam Africa Magazine.

== Awards and recognitions ==
Asante is the recipient of the 2016 and 2018 of the Glitz Style Awards Photographer of the year.

Culture Trip in 2017 listed him as one of the 10 Ghanaian photographers "leading the way in directing the gaze to a modern and multifaceted African nation" along with Ghana's first photographer, Mr James Barnor.

He also received nominated in Creative and Support Arts category at the EMY Awards in 2021.

He was selected for the Editor's Choice by photo-sharing website, 500 px for his image Black Girl Magic. His body of work alongside other artist was presented on the Eranda Studio by the Photographer's Gallery in the United Kingdom. CNN Africa and F Show Stoppers have featured his work on their digital platforms as part of their Artists on Instagram series.
