= Pistis Ghana =

Ghanaian fashion design brand

Pistis Ghana Ltd
- Company type: Privately held
- Industry: Fashion
- Founded: 2008; 17 years ago
- Founder: Kabutey and Sumaiya Dzietror
- Headquarters: Accra, Ghana
- Products: Gowns; Ready-to-wear
- Number of employees: 60 (2020)

Pistis Ghana is a Ghanaian fashion brand based in Accra. It was founded by husband-and-wife duo Kabutey and Sumaiya Dzietror in 2008 after graduating from Joyce Ababio's Vogue Style School of Fashion and Design.

Pistis means "faith" in Greek. They are famous for making designs for Ghana's second lady, Samira Bawumia, in modern Kente dresses.

== History ==
In 2008, Sumaiya Mohammed and Kabutey Dzietror, who had recently graduated from the Joyce Ababio College of Creative Design (Vogue Style), founded Pistis after finding common ground in fashion and design as students.

The fashion house started at East Legon in Kabutey Dzietror's family home and after two years set up a front boutique to attract clients. Pistis Ghana became famous for their hand-beaded bridal gowns and infusion of African wax fabrics and kente in clothes for Ghanaian woman.

== Notable designs ==
On 7 January 2017, Samira Bawumia attended the inauguration of Nana Akufo-Addo and wore a Northern Kente dress from Pistis that went viral. The viral garment brought national attention to the young business and was also massively copied by other tailors.

Another design paid tribute to Bawumia's Fulani heritage on Ghana's Independence Day.

They have also designed for a number of celebrities, corporate executives and public figures including Naomi Campbell, Charlotte Osei, Naa Ashorkor,Eve, Josleyn Dumas, Yvonne Okoro, Valerie Lawson, Berla Mundi, and Ghana's former First Lady, Rebecca Akufo-Addo.

== Fashion shows ==
Pistis was the first Ghanaian fashion brand to showcase at the Runway Dubai Season III. They have also shown their designs at Glitz Africa Fashion Week 2013, Radiance Bridal Show and the Vlisco Fashion Show in Ghana. They were participants at the Africa Fashion Show in Geneva.

In addition, Pistis has had the opportunity to dress the finalists for the Miss Malaika Ghana for 2012, 2013, and 2014 seasons.

At the visit of Prince Charles and Camilla, Duchess of Cornwall to Ghana, the government of Ghana organised a royal banquet and fashion show in their honour. Pistis was chosen as part of a number of Ghanaian and British Ghanaian designers to showcase at the show.

== Philanthropy ==
During the peak of the COVID-19 pandemic, Pistis along with Naa Ashorkor donated 1000 face masks to porters in the Madina as part of its social responsibility.

== Awards ==
Red Carpet Designer of the Year - Glitz Style Awards

ETV Ghana Designer of the Year 2016
