= St Mary's Senior High School (Ghana) =

Location
- Greater Accra Region; Korle Gonno; Ghana; 5°32′08″N 0°13′28″W

Information
- School type: All Girls School
- Motto: Truth and Virtue
- Founded: 1950; 76 years ago
- Founder: Catholic Missionary sisters,Servants of the Holy Spirit
- Oversight: Ministry of Education
- Gender: Girls
- Classes offered: Home Economics, General Science, General Arts,Visual Art, Business.
- Colours: Blue; White
- Nickname: Merries

St. Mary's Senior High School is an all female second cycle institution in Korle Gonno in the Greater Accra Region, Ghana.

== History ==
St. Mary's Senior High School was established on 6 February 1950 by the Catholic missionary sisters known as Sister Servants of the Holy Spirit (SSPS).The school started with ten girls and a staff of two (2) Reverend sisters namely: the late Reverend Sisters, Jane and Rosette.

The school has an alliance with Accra Academy, which is seen as the brother school of St. Mary's Senior High School. This alliance is aimed at promoting intellectual development between students of both institutions. Their alliance involves the sharing of ideas at social gatherings and entertainment.

== Headmistresses ==
- Rev. Sr. Jane(1950-1953)
- Rev. Mother Bernadette(1953-1954)
- Rev. Sr. Pierre(1955 - 1968)
- Rev. Sr. Mary Grace(1968 - 1970)
- Rev. Sr. Ruth (1970-1980)
- Mrs. Elizabeth Joyce Sowah(1980-2001)
- Mrs. Victoria Opoku (2001-2002)
- Miss Doris Bramson(2002 to 2017)
- Mrs. Grace Mansa Eshun(2017 to 2021)
- Miss Philomena Owusu-Ansah (2021 to date)

== Achievements ==
- Won the 2007 Sprite Ball Championship

== Notable alumni ==
- Dzifa Affainie- Television presenter and anchor
- Shirley Ayorkor Botchway (born 1963) - Secretary-General of the Commonwealth of Nations, former Foreign Minister of Ghana.
- Ophelia Crossland- Ghanaian fashion designer and Creative director
- Christabel Ekeh (born 1990) - actress
- Jean Adukwei Mensa - Chairperson of Electoral Commission, former Executive Director of the Institute of Economic Affairs, Legon.
- MzVee (born 1992) - Ghanaian Musician.
- Rita Korankye Ankrah - Wife of Sam Korankye Ankrah
- Goski Alabi - Ghanaian academic, Professor of Quality Management and Leadership at University of Professional Studies Accra (UPSA)
- Velma Owusu-Bempah, Ghanaian milliner and accessories designer

== See also ==
- PeaceJam Ghana
- Sprite Ball Championship
