= Roberta Annan =

Ghanaian businesswoman and investor

- Born: 2 December 1982 (age 43); Accra
- Education: Carleton University B.SC Georgetown University
- Occupations: Business woman, Investor and Philanthropist
- Known for: Business
- Children: 1

Roberta Annan (born 2 December 1982) is a Ghanaian businesswoman and the founder of the African Fashion Foundation. She is also an investor, philanthropist, and a United Nations Environment Programme Goodwill Ambassador. Annan was the youngest African to be inducted into the African Leadership Hall of Fame. A graduate of Carleton University and Georgetown University, Annan began her career with an internship at the U.N. headquarters in New York City. Annan is the owner of Annan Capital Partners, an investment company in Sub-Saharan Africa, and ALDG, a portfolio of assets in sustainable hospitality, agribusiness, and sustainable luxury in Africa.

== Education ==
Annan attended the SOS-Hermann Gmeiner International College. She graduated summa cum laude in Biochemistry from Carleton University in Ottawa, Canada, and earned a master's degree in Biotechnology from Georgetown University.

== Career ==
Annan, who speaks both English and the Akan dialect, worked as a Research Analyst Intern at the University of Giessen and with multi-nationals like Athgo International and MAP International between 2005 and 2007.

In 2008, Annan joined the United Nations as an intern and later became a consultant for the UN, mobilising funds and resources for UN projects worldwide. In 2012, she founded Roberta Annan Consulting, re-branded to Annan Capital Partners in 2016 after two years with LJ Africa Advisors.

In 2017, Annan was appointed the Senior Market Liaison for Fieldstone Africa where she led on business strategy and marketing. She has served on boards including The Frallain Group, Industrie Africa, Women's Empowerment and Investment Group, and Ghana France Business Club. She was an adviser to The Rose of Sharon Foundation, by Nigerian business magnate, Folorunsho Alakija and The European Commission Devco Steering Committee for the International Colloquium for the Creative Economy.

In 2011, Annan founded the Africa Fashion Foundation (AFF) to support Africa's growing fashion industry. She is the co-founder of the Impact Fund for African Creatives (IFFAC), a €100 million impact investment fund aimed at supporting Africa's creative and lifestyle industries.

Roberta Annan Consulting was also a franchise owner of the Miss Universe Pageant from 2011 to 2015, but handed this over to new management after allegations that the contest had not been fairly run.

== Fund raising and philanthropy ==
Annan has been recognised for fundraising projects including the €100 Million Funds for African Creatives in partnership with UN-ITC Ethical Fashion Initiative.

Annan Capital also raised funds through engagement with High-net-worth individuals, corporations and foundations for both non-profit and for-profit initiatives projects from $6MM to $100MM.

Under the African Foundation Kayayei Initiative, Annan and other Ghanaian women including Ophelia Crossland, Torlowei and Velma Owusu-Bempah trained head porters known as Kayayei in fashion and millinery.

During the peak of the COVID-19 outbreak in Ghana, WEIG in partnership with Annan Capital Partners and GUBA, launched the COVID-19 Stimulus Fund, offering financial prizes to support and invest in female-led enterprises in Ghana.

== Awards and recognitions ==
Annan is a member of the Young President Organization (YPO) and currently the UNEP Goodwill Ambassador for the Creative Economy, '20 under 40 Influential Business Leaders in Ghana', the "40 under 40 Influential Business Leaders in Consulting" and the "100 Young Influential Africans", "Youngest African ever to be inducted into the African Leadership Hall of Fame".

Annan spoke at the United Nations Conference on Trade and Development round table panel discussion with Isabelle Durant, Deputy Secretary-General of UNCTAD; Mahendra Siregar, Deputy Minister of Foreign Affairs of the Republic of Indonesia and Marisa Henderson, Head of UNCTAD Creative Economy.

Annan is an advisory council member of the prestigious Condé Nast College of Fashion and Design. She works alongside Edward Enninful, Victoria Beckham, Naomi Campbell, Suzy Menkes and Sarah Mower.

=== Awards ===
- Global Style Icon Awards 2020 - Fashionpreneur of the year
- The Business Executive Award - She Achiever Award 2020
- 40 Influential Business Leaders Award 2018
- 20 under 40 Influential Business Leaders Award 2017
- Ghana Feminine Awards
- Africa Leadership Hall of Fame (NYC)
- World Fashion 4 Development Program (WF4D) Leadership Award
- Women Leadership Award Woman 2.1
- 2013 Game Changer Honors
- 2019 - ENTREPRENEUR OF THE YEAR AWARD

== Personal life ==
Annan lives with her mother and her son Allain in Accra, Ghana.
