= Claudia Lumor =

Ghanaian publisher

Claudia Lumor (born 17 June 1980) is a German born Ghanaian Publisher, and founder of Glitz Africa Magazine and the Glitz Style Awards. She is also the Executive Producer of Glitz Africa Fashion Week Ghana.

Claudia's company, Glitz Africa has become an influential showcase for fashion creatives in Ghana and West African nations including designers, stylists and hair and makeup artists.

== Early life and education ==
Lumor grew up in Kumasi and attended Kumasi Anglican Secondary School before enrolling at Kwame Nkrumah University. She graduated with a B.A in Economics and Law. She also studied Corporate Finance Law at Westminster Law School in London. She also holds an Executive Diploma in Publishing from Yale University.

== Career ==
She worked at Santander Bank UK and later moved to Ghana to work with Stanbic Bank in 2010. Lumor was named amongst the speakers of WomanRising, a network for women entrepreneurs. The event featured five women in entrepreneurship: Kafui Danku, Deloris Frimpong Manso, Ekow Mensah, Vera Osei-Bonsu and Cynthia Quarcoo. She was included in the list of 50 young Chief executive officers in Ghana by Avance Media and The YCEO. She is a Goodwill Ambassador for the UNFPA.

== Politics ==
Claudia lost the bid to become the New Patriotic Party (NPP) parliamentary candidature for the Oforikrom constituency. She was the only female among five personalities contesting for the primaries.

== Recognition ==
- Young creative entrepreneur of the year - British Council Fashion And Design 2015
- Start up and Entrepreneur of the year - Ghana Startup Awards 2017
- 100 most Influential women in Ghana
