= Valerie Lawson =

Ghanaian makeup artist (born 1991)

- Born: Valerie O. Lawson; 1 August 1991 (age 33); Ghana
- Education: Holy Child Senior High School
- Alma mater: University of Ghana
- Occupations: Makeup Artist; Beauty Entrepreneur; Creative Director
- Years active: 2010 – present

Valerie O. Lawson (born 1 August 1991), is a Ghanaian makeup artist known for her work in both the bridal and commercial spaces. She is also the Ghanaian artistic director for American cosmetics company, Maybelline New York and the founder of the brand, Contours By Valerie Lawson.

== Early life ==
Valerie Lawson was born on August 1, 1991, in Ghana to Army Officer, Rtd Colonel Emmanuel Nii Lante Lawson and Clothing Designer Mrs. Joan Lawson. She is the second of three children.

Lawson attended an all girls Catholic boarding school, Holy Child Secondary School from 2006 to 2009 and was fond of making sketches of her classmates. She subsequently attended the University of Ghana in 2009 where she studied Business Administration.

== Career ==
In 2014, she landed her first job with Wax print manufacturer, Printex and started her bridal makeup career with a model on the set.

She has also worked with several Ghanaian fashion brands including Pistis Ghana, Christie Brown, Mina Evans, Charlotte Prive, Nadrey Laurent, Sarah Christian and the Hat Box Company on several fashion campaigns and editorials.

In 2016, Lawson collaborated with fashion house Pistis Ghana and Let's Be Seated Limited to create a bridal campaign for Christian and Muslim brides that was received by the wedding industry including a mention by wedding planner, David Tutera.

The campaign has become an annual project and has been released each year since the first release.

=== Maybelline appointment ===
On 8 March 2020, Lawson was appointed artistic director for Maybelline New York and became the first Ghanaian makeup artist to occupy the artistic director role in Ghana, for Maybelline New York.

== Cosmetic line ==
Lawson in 2017 announced the launch of her cosmetic brand, CVL Beauty. CVL beauty has released a range of beauty tools and accessories including brushes designed for professional makeup artists across Africa and black women.

== Awards ==
| Year | Event | Prize | Result |
| 2017 | Glitz Africa Style Awards | Makeup Artist of The Year | Won |
| 2018 | Ghana Makeup Awards | Best Bridal Makeup Artist | Won |
| 2018 | Glitz Africa Style Awards | Makeup Artist of The Year | Won |
| 2019 | Ghana Makeup Awards | Makeup Artist of The Year | Won |
| 2020 | Beauty Fest Africa | Beauty Makeup Artiste of The Year | Won |
| 2021 | 40 UNDER 40 | Beauty & Lifestyle Category | Won |
| 2021 | Women Choice Awards | Makeup Artist of The Year | Won |
