= 2024 Commonwealth Heads of Government Meeting =

Diplomatic conference

27th Commonwealth Heads of Government Meeting CHOGM

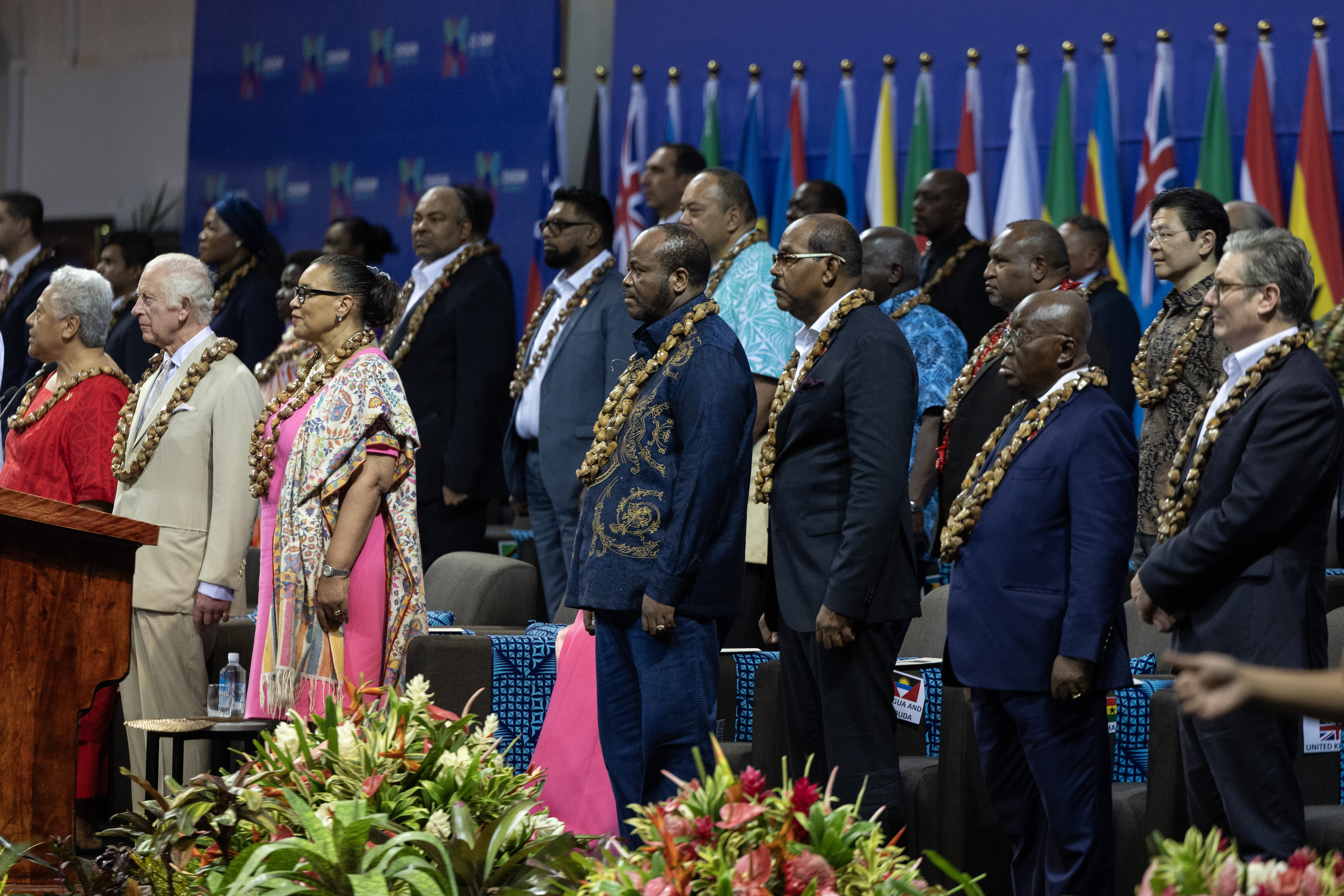
- Host country: Samoa
- Dates: 25–26 October 2024
- Cities: Apia and Mulifanua (retreat)
- Chair: Fiamē Naomi Mataʻafa, Prime Minister of Samoa
- Follows: 2022
- Precedes: 2026
- Website: https://samoachogm2024.ws

Key points
- Election of Secretary-General, Apia Commonwealth Ocean Declaration (climate change and small states), Commonwealth Principles on Freedom of Expression and the Role of the Media

The 2024 Commonwealth Heads of Government Meeting (Samoan: 2024 Fonotaga a Ulu o Malo o le Taupulega), also known as CHOGM 2024, was the 27th meeting of the heads of government of the Commonwealth of Nations. The meeting was held in Samoa from 25–26 October 2024 and was preceded by ministerial meetings, fora and side events which had begun on 21 October 2024.

The meeting was the first full Commonwealth summit held since the death of Queen Elizabeth II in 2022 and the first presided over by King Charles III as Head of the Commonwealth. It was also the first Commonwealth Heads of Government Meeting held in a Pacific Small Island Developing State. The King's trip to the South Pacific, which included a tour of Australia prior to the Commonwealth summit in Samoa, was his first major overseas trip since his cancer diagnosis in early 2024.

== Theme ==
The summit’s theme was "One Resilient Common Future: Transforming our Common Wealth". The stated aim of the meeting was to strengthen "resilient democratic institutions upholding human rights, democracy, and the rule of law". It also claimed to seek to combat climate change, in particular with regard to its impact on small states and island states.

== Election of Secretary-General ==
There was an election for a new Commonwealth Secretary-General as incumbent Patricia Scotland had indicated in 2022 that she would only serve another two years. Ghanaian foreign minister Shirley Ayorkor Botchwey, Gambian foreign minister Mamadou Tangara, and Senator Joshua Septiba of Lesotho announced their candidacies for the position. All three candidates called for financial reparations or "reparative justice" for countries that have been harmed by slavery or colonialism. Botchwey was chosen as the next secretary-general on 26 October.

== Climate change ==
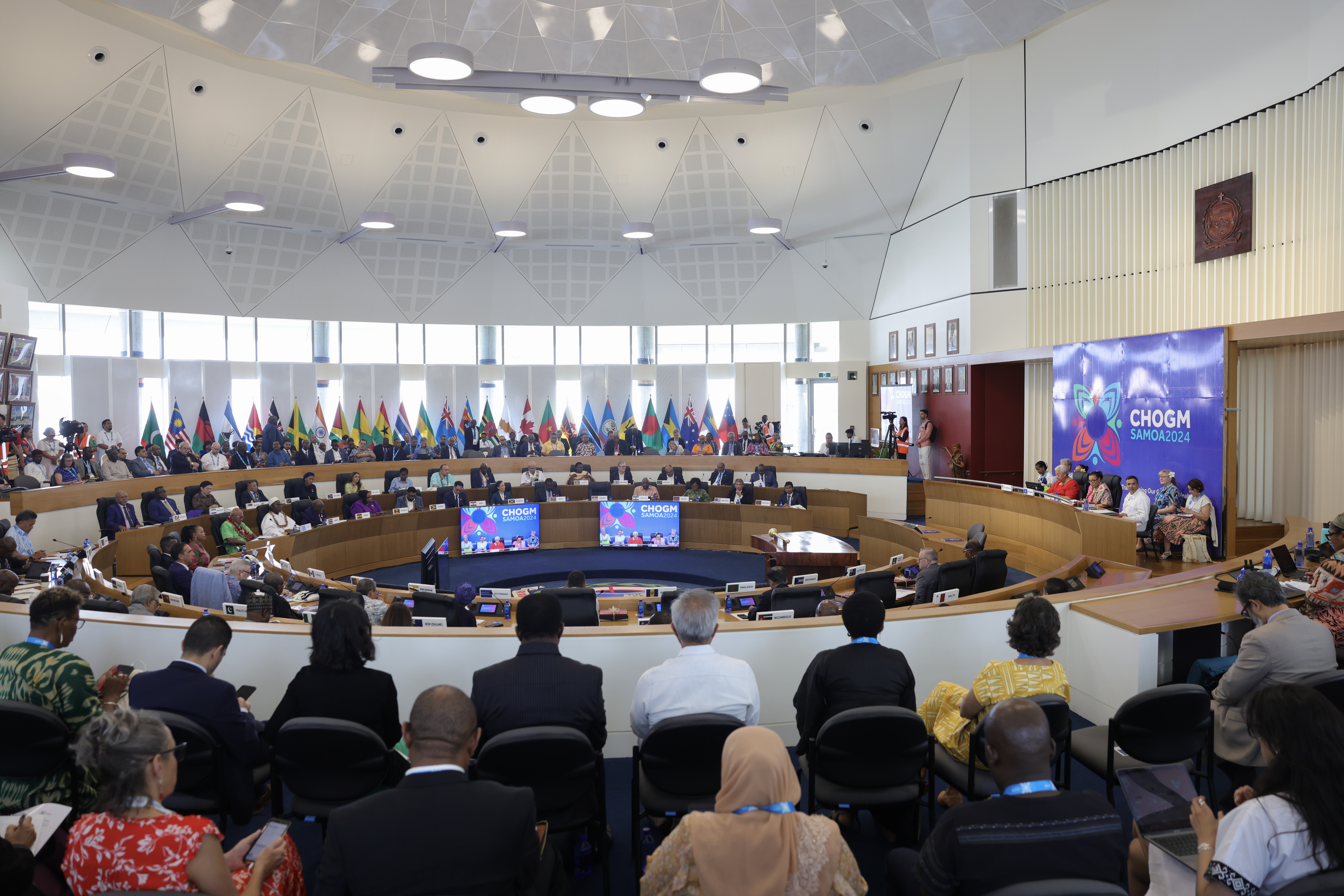
Leaders attending an executive session of CHOGM at Maota Fono

In his opening address, the King referred to "the existential threat of climate change" as an "urgent challenge".

=== Ocean Declaration ===
Commonwealth leaders adopted the 'Apia Commonwealth Ocean Declaration for One Resilient Common Future', which called on all 56 Commonwealth nations to protect the ocean in the face of rising sea levels, pollution and over-exploitation. It called for recognizing maritime boundaries as fixed, even if rising sea levels cause islands to be submerged. According to Reuters, this would mean resources such as fishing grounds would continue to belong to an island state even if it became submerged and its people relocated.

The declaration also called for protecting oceans, restoring degraded marine ecosystems by 2030, finalising the global plastic pollution treaty, ratifying the high-seas biodiversity treaty, developing coastal climate adaptation plans, and strengthening support for sustainable "blue economies".

=== Australia–Britain partnership ===
A 'Climate and Energy Partnership' was agreed between Australia and Britain, intended to focus on accelerating renewable energy development by co-operating on such technology as green hydrogen and offshore wind power generation. Australian Prime Minister Anthony Albanese stated that the partnership would “ensure we maximise the economic potential of the net zero transition, and build on our long-standing cooperation on international climate action and shared commitment to reach net zero emissions by 2050.”

== Slavery reparations ==
In August, former Jamaican prime minister P. J. Patterson, told the media that reparations for slavery was one of the agenda items to be discussed at the summit. However, the United Kingdom insisted that reparations was not on the agenda, and that the UK was not considering making any reparation payments. The British government also said there would be no apology for Britain's role in the Atlantic slave trade made at the summit. British Foreign Secretary David Lammy, of Caribbean descent, previously expressed a desire for reparations in 2018.

In his speech at the beginning of the summit, the King addressed the issue: "I understand from listening to people across the Commonwealth how the most painful aspects of our past continue to resonate. It is vital, therefore, that we understand our history, to guide us toward making the right choices in future." The King would have been unable to issue an apology for Britain's role in the slave trade without being advised to do so by the government.

At the conclusion of the summit, a joint communiqué was issued. It affirmed that Commonwealth states "agreed that the time has come for a meaningful, truthful and respectful conversation towards forging a common future based on equity” and that they would hold conversations to address the “harms” of slavery, particularly those afflicted on women and girls, who “suffered disproportionately from these appalling tragedies in the history of humanity”. The statement also said that it recognised that most Commonwealth states in both the Atlantic and Pacific “share common historical experiences in relation to this abhorrent trade, chattel enslavement, the debilitation and dispossession of Indigenous people”. It referred to what it called the “enduring effects” of this history and the practice of 'blackbirding', in which Pacific Islanders were exploited in Australia and other colonies.

== Attendees ==
Country	Representative	Position
Commonwealth	Charles III	Head of the Commonwealth
Commonwealth	Patricia Scotland	Secretary-General
Antigua and Barbuda	Gaston Browne	Prime Minister
Australia	Anthony Albanese	Prime Minister
Bahamas	Philip Davis	Prime Minister
Bangladesh	Md. Touhid Hossain	Adviser for Foreign Affairs
Barbados	Kerrie Symmonds	Minister of Foreign Affairs and Foreign Trade
Belize	Francis Fonseca	Minister of Foreign Affairs
Botswana	Mmasekgoa Masire-Mwamba	High Commissioner to the United Kingdom
Brunei	Erywan Yusof	Minister of Foreign Affairs II
Cameroon	Joseph Ngute	Prime Minister
Canada	Ralph Goodale	High Commissioner to the United Kingdom
Cyprus	Konstantinos Ioannou	Minister of the Interior
Dominica	Vince Henderson	Minister of Foreign Affairs
Eswatini	Mswati III	King
Fiji	Sitiveni Rabuka	Prime Minister
Gabon	No representative	
Gambia	Muhammad B. S. Jallow	Vice President
Ghana	Nana Akufo-Addo	President
Grenada	Rachér Croney	High Commissioner to the United Kingdom
Guyana	Irfaan Ali	President
India	Kiren Rijiju	Minister of Parliamentary Affairs
Jamaica	Kamina Johnson Smith	Minister of Foreign Affairs
Kenya	Musalia Mudavadi	Prime Cabinet Secretary
Kiribati	Tukabu Tauati	High Commissioner to Fiji
Lesotho	Sam Matekane	Prime Minister
Malawi	Nancy Tembo	Minister of Foreign Affairs, Trade and International Cooperation
Malaysia	Mohamad Hasan	Minister of Foreign Affairs
Maldives	Hussain Mohamed Latheef	Vice President
Malta	Ian Borg	Deputy Prime Minister
Mauritius	Joyker Nayeck	Foreign Secretary
Mozambique	Carlos Mesquita	Minister of Transport and Communications
Namibia	Peya Mushelenga	Minister of Foreign Affairs
Nauru	Lionel Aingimea	Minister of Foreign Affairs
New Zealand	Christopher Luxon	Prime Minister
Nigeria	Kashim Shettima	Vice President
Pakistan	Ishaq Dar	Deputy Prime Minister
Papua New Guinea	James Marape	Prime Minister
Rwanda	Paul Kagame	President
Saint Kitts and Nevis	Denzil Douglas	Minister of Foreign Affairs
Saint Lucia	Alva Baptiste	Minister of Foreign Affairs
Saint Vincent and the Grenadines	Frederick Stephenson	Minister of Foreign Affairs
Samoa	Fiamē Naomi Mataʻafa (Chair-in-office)	Prime Minister
Seychelles	Ahmed Afif	Vice President
Sierra Leone	Julius Maada Bio	President
Singapore	Lawrence Wong	Prime Minister
Solomon Islands	Peter Shannel Agovaka	Minister of Foreign Affairs
South Africa	Thandi Moraka	Deputy Minister of International Relations
Sri Lanka	Manorie Mallikaratchy	Deputy High Commissioner to the United Kingdom
Tanzania	Mahmoud Thabit Kombo	Minister of Foreign Affairs
Togo	Victoire Tomegah Dogbé	Prime Minister
Tonga	Siaosi Sovaleni	Prime Minister
Trinidad and Tobago	Keith Rowley	Prime Minister
Tuvalu	Feleti Teo	Prime Minister
Uganda	Jessica Alupo	Vice President
United Kingdom	Keir Starmer	Prime Minister
Vanuatu	Charlot Salwai	Prime Minister
Zambia	Mulambo Haimbe	Minister of Foreign Affairs

== Absences ==
Instead of attending the Commonwealth summit, South African president Cyril Ramaphosa and Indian prime minister Narendra Modi attended the 16th BRICS summit, chaired by Vladimir Putin, which was scheduled for the same week in Kazan, Russia. According to The Independent, this is an indication that the two countries "place greater weight on maintaining relations with China and Russia than on the more diffuse attractions of CHOGM". In the absence of Prime Minister Modi, India's delegation to the 2024 CHOGM was led by Minister of Parliamentary Affairs Kiren Rijiju. South Africa's delegation was led by Deputy Minister of International Relations and Cooperation Thandi Moraka.

Canadian prime minister Justin Trudeau was also absent from the meeting, due to facing a leadership challenge. Sri Lankan president, Anura Kumara Dissanayake was also absent as he was still transitioning to his presidency.
