= Dzifa =

Dzifa is a given name. It may refer to:

== Given name ==
- Dzifa Affainie (born 1980), Ghanaian television presenter and anchor
- Dzifa Attivor (1956–2021), Ghanaian politician and businesswoman
- Dzifa Bampoh, Ghanaian journalist, communications and media personality
- Dzifa Gomashie (born 1965), Ghanaian actress, producer, screen scriptwriter and politician and government minister

== Middle name ==
- Esther Dzifa Ofori, Ghanaian diplomat
