= 2026 Commonwealth Heads of Government Meeting =

2026 Commonwealth summit in Antigua and Barbuda

28th Commonwealth Heads of Government Meeting CHOGM 2026
- Host country: Antigua and Barbuda
- Dates: 3–4 November 2026
- Cities: St. John's and Jumby Bay Island (retreat)
- Participants: 56 Commonwealth member states
- Chair: Gaston Browne, Prime Minister of Antigua and Barbuda
- Follows: 2024
- Website: chogm26.gov.ag

Key points
- Trade and investment, climate resilience, reparatory justice

The 2026 Commonwealth Heads of Government Meeting, also known as CHOGM 2026, was the 28th Commonwealth Heads of Government Meeting, bringing together leaders and representatives of the 56 member states of the Commonwealth of Nations. It was held in St. John's, Antigua and Barbuda, from 3 to 4 November 2026, with associated events taking place from 1 November. Antigua and Barbuda became the smallest country to have hosted a Commonwealth Heads of Government Meeting.

The summit's theme is "Accelerating Partnerships and Investment for a Prosperous Commonwealth". Its announced priorities include climate resilience, trade and investment, innovation, equality and sustainable development. Ahead of the meeting, approximately 30 heads of state or government were expected to attend, according to Commonwealth Secretary-General Shirley Ayorkor Botchwey.

The Commonwealth Secretariat reported that more than 3,000 delegates attended the summit and associated events. It also reported US$500 million in new commitments for initiatives including renewable energy, youth skills development and trade.

== Background and preparations ==
Antigua and Barbuda was selected as the host of the meeting on the final day of the 2024 Commonwealth Heads of Government Meeting in Samoa.

The theme and official logo were unveiled in St. John's in November 2025. The logo was designed by Antiguan artist Chaneil C. Imhoff and incorporates an abstract depiction of the magnificent frigatebird, the country's national bird. Former cricketer Sir Viv Richards was appointed the summit's envoy.

Business, youth, women's and people's forums were held alongside the meeting. The Commonwealth Youth Forum was expected to include approximately 300 delegates and was organised under the theme "Investing in Youth Agency—Co-Creating Pathways towards Shared Prosperity".

The leaders' private retreat was scheduled for 4 November on Jumby Bay Island, a private island resort off the northeastern coast of Antigua. A private breakfast involving business leaders and Commonwealth representatives was planned for that morning, providing opportunities to discuss investment proposals and commercial partnerships.

The meeting was the first CHOGM held during the tenure of Commonwealth Secretary-General Shirley Ayorkor Botchwey, who was selected at the 2024 summit and assumed office on 1 April 2025.

King Charles III arrived at V. C. Bird International Airport on 30 October 2026 ahead of the summit.

=== Proposals for reform ===
In October 2026, Politico reported that officials in the British government under former prime minister Keir Starmer had considered proposals to reduce the frequency and scope of future Commonwealth Heads of Government Meetings. According to Ben Judah, a former special adviser to foreign secretary David Lammy, the Foreign, Commonwealth and Development Office had conducted an internal review following the 2024 summit in Samoa. The review suggested holding CHOGM every four or five years instead of biennially, potentially coordinating it with the Commonwealth Games, and eliminating the final communiqué and leaders' retreat. It also proposed holding an investment conference in alternate years, modelled on the Asia-Pacific Economic Cooperation forum, without the involvement of the Commonwealth Secretariat.

The discussions followed disagreements at the 2024 summit over reparations for slavery, when African and Caribbean leaders pressed the British government to reconsider its opposition to discussing reparations for the transatlantic slave trade. A second former British government official confirmed the existence of the review and said that officials in the Prime Minister's Office had discussed similar concerns about the summit's format. The Foreign Office declined to comment on the review, but an official emphasised that its recommendations did not represent government policy and that any changes to CHOGM arrangements would require agreement among Commonwealth member states.

According to The Guardian, former British prime minister Sir Keir Starmer had intended to skip the 2026 summit before leaving office, planning to send his deputy, David Lammy, instead. Starmer reportedly believed he had been unfairly confronted over reparations at the 2024 summit in Samoa. The newspaper also noted the absence of national leaders from several major Commonwealth economies, including India, Malaysia, Singapore, Pakistan and South Africa, although the prime ministers of Australia and Canada attended. Former Foreign Office adviser Ben Judah cited the attendance figures as evidence of declining interest in the summit among influential Commonwealth members.

British Foreign Secretary Ed Miliband later opposed proposals to reduce the Commonwealth's political role. Miliband favoured retaining CHOGM as a forum for cooperation among countries outside groupings dominated by the United States, China or Russia. Former Foreign Office adviser Ben Judah, however, questioned whether the existing summit format could be sustained, citing the absence of leaders from several major Commonwealth economies. British officials hoped that an agreement on reparatory dialogue would allow future meetings to devote greater attention to trade, investment and development financing.

== Agenda and related issues ==
The summit's priorities included trade and investment, climate resilience, sustainable debt, access to finance, democracy and youth opportunities, particularly for Small Island Developing States.

=== Trade and investment ===
Commonwealth Secretary-General Shirley Ayorkor Botchwey called for expanded trade among member states to reduce dependence on the United States amid rising American tariffs. She said annual intra-Commonwealth trade stood at approximately US$900 billion, with a target of US$2 trillion by the next summit. She also promoted a new Commonwealth investment platform and identified critical minerals as an area for cooperation.

Canadian Prime Minister Mark Carney attended to strengthen economic ties and diversify Canada's trade relationships. Canada conducts approximately C$100 billion in annual trade with Commonwealth partners. Carney was expected to return to Ottawa on 3 November for the federal budget, missing the leaders' retreat.

The final communiqué endorsed reform of the World Trade Organization, including its dispute settlement system, and called for removing unjustified non-tariff barriers between Commonwealth members. It welcomed the launch of the Commonwealth Trade Portal to help small businesses, particularly women-owned and youth-led enterprises, access information about products, services and commercial opportunities. Leaders also encouraged members to engage with the Commonwealth Critical Minerals Alliance, established by the Commonwealth Secretariat to promote cooperation on mineral supply chains and processing.

=== Climate change and development finance ===
The communiqué reaffirmed support for the Paris Agreement and called for greater access to climate finance for developing countries, particularly small island developing states. It supported the use of debt-pause clauses, concessional financing and other instruments to address climate vulnerability. Leaders also endorsed maintaining maritime zones and associated rights established under the United Nations Convention on the Law of the Sea despite physical changes caused by rising sea levels.

=== Democracy and digital cooperation ===
The communiqué supported strengthening the Commonwealth Ministerial Action Group and welcomed plans for a Commonwealth early warning system to monitor indicators of democratic governance and political instability. It also encouraged cooperation on artificial intelligence governance, digital infrastructure and measures against technology-facilitated gender-based violence.

=== Reparatory justice ===
Reparations for slavery became a prominent issue despite their exclusion from the formal agenda. Host Prime Minister Gaston Browne called for a Commonwealth reparations framework, while former Saint Vincent and the Grenadines prime minister Ralph Gonsalves urged that the issue be placed on the agenda.

In June 2026, African and Caribbean representatives endorsed a 19-point plan calling for apologies, debt relief, development financing, the return of cultural property and a global reparations fund. In July, Caribbean Community (CARICOM) leaders agreed to prioritize reparations at CHOGM and supported Jamaica's planned petition to the King.

Gonsalves alleged that British and Canadian officials had opposed placing reparations on the agenda, with British representatives reportedly warning that Prime Minister Andy Burnham might not attend. The British Foreign Office denied attempting to prevent discussion. Burnham expressed willingness to discuss a formal apology but maintained the United Kingdom's opposition to financial reparations. Guyanese President Irfaan Ali proposed a Commonwealth subcommittee to develop a framework for negotiations.

At the opening ceremony on 3 November, the King described the transatlantic slave trade as a "shameful chapter of history" that filled him with "the most profound personal sorrow". He stopped short of an apology but called for cooperation to address historical injustices through education, economic opportunities and climate resilience.

The final communiqué welcomed the United Kingdom government's agreement to engage in a structured, time-bound and inclusive dialogue with affected parties concerning the transatlantic trafficking of enslaved Africans and its historical harms. It also acknowledged initiatives by the United Nations, African Union and CARICOM concerning reparatory justice and the restitution of cultural heritage. The document did not announce a British apology or financial reparations.

Reparations campaigners, including Sir Hilary Beckles of the CARICOM Reparations Commission, organized demonstrations and vigils during the summit and called for negotiations with former colonial powers.

Following the summit, The Guardian reported that British officials would begin drafting a formal apology for the country's role in the transatlantic slave trade, with discussions expected to continue over the following months. The government continued to rule out direct financial reparations. According to the newspaper, British officials believed that an apology could address demands for acknowledgement of historical injustices without creating legal liability for compensation. A former senior government lawyer told the newspaper that an apology would not, by itself, establish a legal entitlement to reparations.

The report also stated that Foreign Secretary Ed Miliband had advocated addressing the reparations issue through an apology rather than attempting to exclude it from the summit's agenda. British officials hoped to shift future Commonwealth discussions towards trade, investment, climate change and debt restructuring. Former prime minister Gordon Brown was expected to lead work on debt restructuring ahead of the United Kingdom's forthcoming G20 presidency.

=== Parliamentary security and online abuse ===
On 3 November, the United Kingdom and Australia announced an initiative to combat online abuse and threats against parliamentarians, particularly women. They pledged to work with the Commonwealth Parliamentary Association and Commonwealth Women Parliamentarians on protective measures, with the first forum planned for 2027.

=== Royal succession ===
Ahead of the summit, Canada, Australia and New Zealand expressed support for removing Andrew Mountbatten-Windsor from the British line of succession. The British government was considering legislation requiring coordination among the 15 Commonwealth realms.

The Times reported that the King was expected to discuss the issue privately with Commonwealth leaders, although royal succession was not on the formal agenda.

== Associated events ==
A cricket match involving Commonwealth heads of government and senior government representatives was scheduled for 1 November 2026 at the Sir Vivian Richards Stadium. Organised by Cricket West Indies, the government of Antigua and Barbuda and the Commonwealth Secretariat, the event was to feature Caribbean and wider Commonwealth teams captained by Guyanese president Irfaan Ali and Kenyan deputy president Kithure Kindiki, respectively. Gaston Browne, Godwin Friday and Philip Davis were also confirmed to participate. Former cricketers Sir Viv Richards and David Gower were appointed honorary team managers. The leaders' match was to be followed by an under-23 match between Caribbean and wider Commonwealth teams.

== Attendees ==
On 28 October 2026, the government of Antigua and Barbuda announced that 53 of the Commonwealth's 56 member states had confirmed their participation in the summit. Commonwealth Secretary-General Shirley Ayorkor Botchwey said that approximately 30 national leaders were expected to attend. The prime minister of India and Prime Minister of New Zealand and the president of South Africa were not expected to attend in person. Canadian Prime Minister Mark Carney attended on 3 November and was scheduled to depart that evening, before the leaders' retreat on 4 November.

The following representatives attended or were announced as attending the summit or its associated events. Where a country's representative has not been publicly identified, the entry is marked TBA.

Country	Representative	Position
Commonwealth	Charles III	Head of the Commonwealth
Commonwealth	Shirley Ayorkor Botchwey	Secretary-General
Antigua and Barbuda	Gaston Browne (Chair-in-office)	Prime Minister
Australia	Anthony Albanese	Prime Minister
Bahamas	Philip Davis	Prime Minister
Bangladesh	Humaiun Kobir	Acting Minister of Foreign Affairs
Barbados	Mia Mottley	Prime Minister
Belize	Johnny Briceño	Prime Minister
Botswana	TBA	TBA
Brunei	Mohd Amin Liew Abdullah	Second Minister of Finance
Cameroon	Joseph Ngute	Prime Minister
Canada	Mark Carney	Prime Minister
Cyprus	Clea Hadjistephanou Papaellina	Deputy Minister of Culture
Dominica	Vince Henderson	Minister of Foreign Affairs
Eswatini	Russell Mmiso Dlamini	Prime Minister
Fiji	Inoke Kubuabola	Prime Minister's Special Envoy
Gabon	Aichatou Sanni Aoudou	Ambassador at-Large in charge of Commonwealth Affairs
Gambia	Fatou Bensouda	High Commissioner of the Gambia to the United Kingdom
Ghana	John Dramani Mahama	President
Grenada	Adrian Thomas	Minister for Tourism, the Creative Economy and Culture
Guyana	Irfaan Ali	President
India	S. Jaishankar	Minister of External Affairs
Jamaica	Andrew Holness	Prime Minister
Kenya	Kithure Kindiki	Deputy President
Kiribati	TBA	TBA
Lesotho	Sam Matekane	Prime Minister
Malawi	George Chaponda	Minister of Foreign Affairs and International Cooperation
Malaysia	Mohamad Hasan	Minister of Foreign Affairs
Maldives	Hussain Mohamed Latheef	Vice President
Malta	Ian Borg	Deputy Prime Minister
Mauritius	Navin Ramgoolam	Prime Minister
Mozambique	Maria Benvinda Levy	Prime Minister
Namibia	Elijah Ngurare	Prime Minister
Nauru	TBA	TBA
New Zealand	Gabrielle Rush	Special Envoy (Note: The New Zealand Prime Minister and other government members were absent due to the 2026 general election.)
Nigeria	George Akume	Secretary to the Government of the Federation
Pakistan	Muhammad Saleem	High Commissioner of Pakistan to Canada
Papua New Guinea	Justin Tkatchenko	Minister for Foreign Affairs
Rwanda	Paul Kagame	President
Saint Kitts and Nevis	Geoffrey Hanley	Deputy Prime Minister
Saint Lucia	Philip J. Pierre	Prime Minister
Saint Vincent and the Grenadines	Godwin Friday	Prime Minister
Samoa	Mulipola Anarosa Ale Molioʻo	Deputy Prime Minister
Seychelles	Wallace Cosgrow	Principal Minister and Minister for Fisheries, Agriculture and Blue Economy
Sierra Leone	Julius Maada Bio	President
Singapore	Gan Kim Yong	Deputy Prime Minister
Solomon Islands	Francis Sade	Deputy Prime Minister
South Africa	Jeremiah Nyamane Mamabolo	High Commissioner of South Africa to the United Kingdom
Sri Lanka	Harini Amarasuriya	Prime Minister
Tanzania	Mahmoud Thabit Kombo	Minister of Foreign Affairs and East African Cooperation
Togo	Robert Dussey	Minister of Foreign Affairs, Cooperation and African Integration
Tonga	Fatafehi Fakafānua	Prime Minister
Trinidad and Tobago	Sean Sobers	Minister of Foreign and CARICOM Affairs
Tuvalu	Feleti Teo	Prime Minister
Uganda	Robinah Nabbanja	Prime Minister
United Kingdom	Andy Burnham	Prime Minister
Vanuatu	Odo Tevi	Permanent Representative of Vanuatu to the United Nations
Zambia	Mulambo Haimbe	Minister of Foreign Affairs and International Cooperation

=== Future meetings ===
The host of the next Commonwealth Heads of Government Meeting, expected to be held in 2028, was not announced. Maldives and Kenya have both expressed interest in hosting the meeting. The Maldivian government formally announced its bid, with Speaker of the People's Majlis Abdul Raheem Abdulla seeking Pakistan's support for their candidacy. Kenyan officials have publicly sought Dominica's support for its bid to host CHOGM 28. India was also discussed as a potential host. Historically, the head of government of the country hosting the next CHOGM was expected to be present at the preceding summit to issue a formal invitation, with Mauritius forced to pull out of hosting the 2015 edition due to the boycott of the 2013 Commonwealth Heads of Government Meeting. None of Maldives, Kenya or India were represented by their respective heads of government.
