= Kofi Okyere Darko =

Ghanaian broadcaster (born 1978)

- Born: 13 January 1978 (age 48); Winneba, Ghana
- Other names: KOD; Richard Aidoo
- Education: Nifa Secondary School; Ghana Institute of Journalism
- Occupations: Broadcaster, fashion designer, Chief Executive Officer
- Spouse: Ophelia Crossland
- Children: 2
- Parent(s): James Aidoo (deceased); Margaret Aidoo

Kofi "KOD" Okyere Darko (born 13 January 1978) is a Ghanaian broadcaster and fashion designer. He is currently the CEO of the clothing line Nineteen 57, and the founder of the annual fashion and music event Rhythms on Da Runway.

== Early life and education ==
KOD, formerly known as Richard Aidoo, was born on 13 January 1978, in Winneba, a town in the Central Region of Ghana. His father, James Aidoo, was a retired deputy director of the Ghana Prisons, and his mother, Margaret Aidoo, was one of the founding members of the 31 December Women's Movement.

KOD had his elementary education in Winneba and later attended Nifa Secondary School in Adukrom. He then studied at the Ghana Institute of Journalism.

== Career ==
Darko's career began as a production assistant for a Ghana Broadcasting Corporation television show. He later joined Radio Gold, then moved to England for work.

He has held positions at fashion designers such as Ted Baker and Paul Smith, before returning to Ghana to continue working for radios. He has been a presenter, events manager, and marketing manager for the EIB Network's LIVE FM, and is currently the host of Starr Drive on Starr FM in Accra.

=== Political appointment ===
In February 2025, he was appointed the Presidential Advisor on Diaspora Affairs by Ghana's president John Mahama.

== Personal life ==
Darko is married to fashion designer Ophelia Crossland. Together they have two daughters.

== Honors and awards ==
- Winner of the 2015 Most Stylish Radio Personality of the Year at Glitz Style Awards
- Nominated as the 2016 Male Fashion Celebrity Icon of the Year at the 2016 Ghana Fashion Awards
- Winner of the 2017 Man of The Year Style Award (Most Fashionable Man of the Year) at the Exclusive Men of the Year Awards.

== See also ==
- List of fashion designers
