= Mai Atafo =

Nigerian fashion tailor

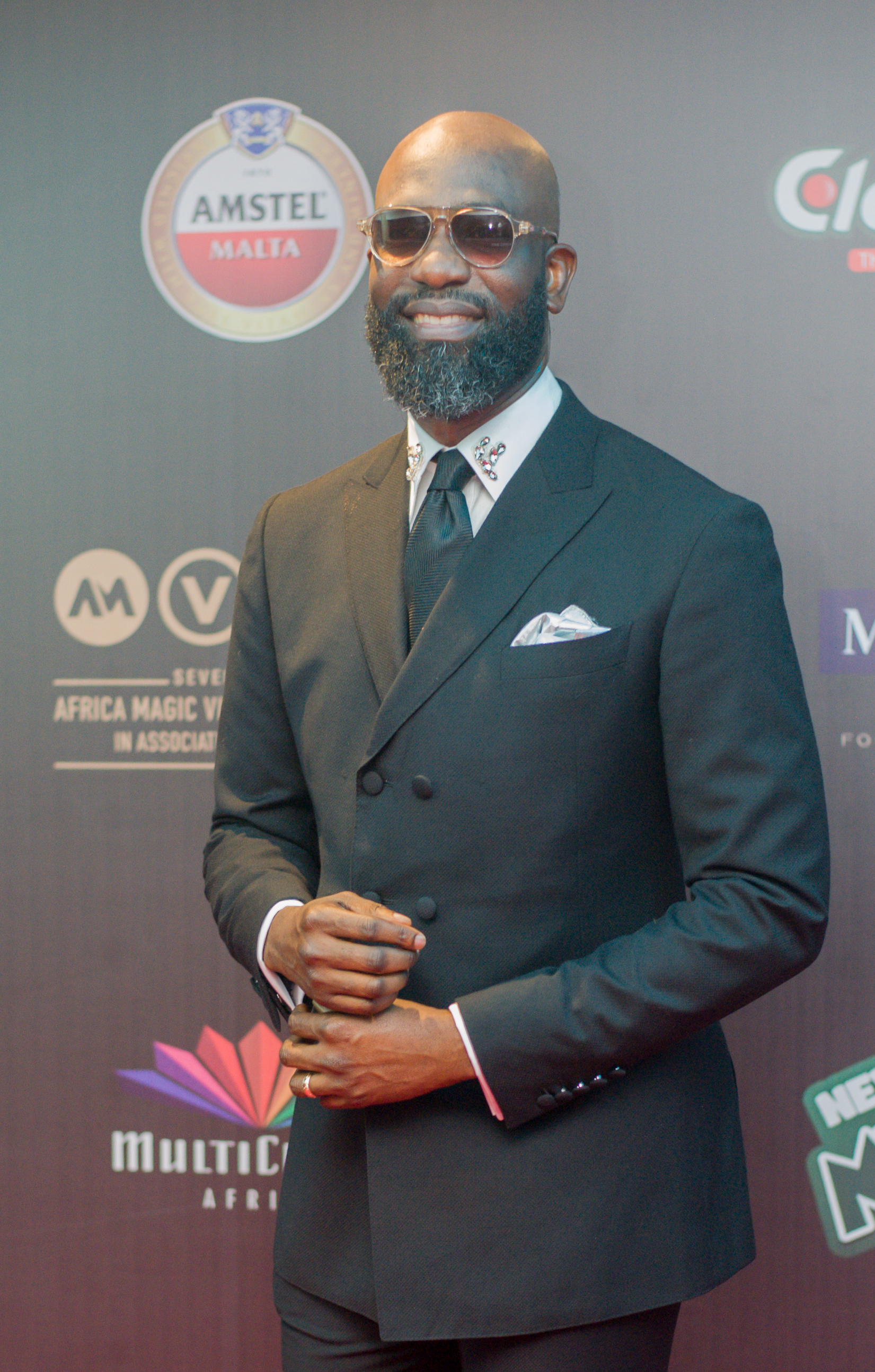
- Mai Atafo at 2020 Africa Magic Viewers Choice Awards
- Born: Ohimai Atafo; Ile-Ife, Osun
- Education: City, University of London
- Occupation: Fashion Tailor

Ohimai Atafo professionally known as Mai Atafo is a Nigerian Fashion Designer known for his brand, Mai Atafo. He underwent training at the Savile Row Academy in Leeds, United Kingdom, to become a skilled tailor.

== Personal life ==
Atafo was born in Ile-Ife, Osun State, and comes from a family of nine children. He is married to Christine Atafo, and they have a child together.

== Career ==
Upon his return from the United Kingdom in 2002, Atafo held various positions in the marketing department at British American Tobacco Nigeria. Subsequently, he moved to Guinness Nigeria where he served as a Brand Manager until his resignation in 2010.

Before departing from Guinness Nigeria, Atafo established the clothing label Mai Atafo Inspired, which garnered attention from celebrities like Omowunmi Akinnifesi, Banky W, and IK Osakioduwa. He briefly served as the Fashion Editor for Genevieve Magazine.

In 2011, Mai Atafo Inspired introduced a wedding line called "Weddings by Mai".

Atafo serves as the Creative Director of Mai Atafo Inspired. Additionally, he holds the role of Strategy Director at the advertising agency Firehouse Group and acted as an emcee for the Miss Nigeria Pageant in 2010. He also heads the Future Awards Central working committee.

== Awards and nominations ==
Year	Award	Category	Result	Reference
2013	Glitz Style Awards	Designer of the Year	Won	
2015	Heineken Lagos Fashion and Design Week	Menswear Designer of the Year	Won	
2017	Abryanz Style and Fashion Awards	Lifestyle/Style Fashion Icon Achievement	Won	
