= Nana Akua Addo =

Ghanaian model

- Nana at 2026 AMVCA
- Born: 9th March, 1984; Germany
- Education: New York Film Academy
- Occupations: Actress; Model; Film Producer
- Known for: Destiny's Child; Blood; Rain; Speechless; Never Again; Tears
- Children: 2
- Awards: Glitz Style awards Best dressed Celebrity, City People Entertainment Awards Best new Actress

Nana Akua Addo is a German-born Ghanaian model, actress, and film producer. She was the second runner-up in Miss Malaika 2003 and the winner of Miss Ghana-Germany in 2005. She has received awards, including the Glitz Style Awards and City People Entertainment Awards. Since the early 2020s, she has become widely known across West African entertainment media for elaborate, sculptural red-carpet fashion, particularly her annual appearances at the Africa Magic Viewers' Choice Awards (AMVCA).

== Education ==
As of 2017, she was studying acting at the New York Film Academy in the United States.

== Career ==
Addo has starred in films including Destiny's Child, Blood, Wanna Be, Rain, Speechless, Never Again and Tears. She also produced two films, Wannabe and Nukuli (The Masked). In later interviews, she said that although she built her career in acting first, her fashion presence ultimately brought her wider recognition than her film work.

== Fashion and red carpet reputation ==
From the early 2020s onward, Addo built a reputation as one of Ghana's most prominent fashion figures, known for avant-garde, architecturally inspired red-carpet looks. Her outfits have regularly generated coverage and social media discussion across Ghanaian and Nigerian entertainment media.

Notable red-carpet appearances include:

- AMVCA 2023 – A metallic silver ensemble with sculptural, wing-like 3D detailing and structured goggles, widely covered as one of the standout looks of the event.
- AMVCA 2024 (10th edition) – A gown incorporating 3D-printed and unconventional materials, paired with a Heidilee "Endless Echo" hat and a Chanel clutch. The gown's design attracted a public dispute over authorship between two designers, and Addo separately discussed its cost in media interviews.
- AMVCA 2025 (11th edition) – A white, laser-cut gown described as fusing fashion and technology, created through a collaborative design process she said took roughly eighteen months to plan.
- AMVCA 2026 (12th edition) – A large-scale gown with an architectural, cathedral-inspired silhouette, designed by Mohammed Abbas Ossu. The look also became the subject of a public authorship dispute with a separate designer, ALmee Couture, who said she had originally been approached to create the piece.

== Awards ==
Some of the awards she has received include:

- Most Stylish Actress in West Africa - Podium Recognition Awards, London, September 2016
- Most Stylish/Dressed Female Celebrity (Africa) - Abryanz Style and Fashion Awards (Asfa) 2017
- Best Dressed celebrity - 2016 Glitz Style Awards
- Best Dressed Celebrity - 2017 Glitz Style Awards.
- Best Dressed Actress - 2015 Ghana Movie Awards red carpet
- Best New Actress - 2014 City People Entertainment Awards.
- Honorary Award for personalities and people from Awukugua - Bring Entertainment in collaboration with Chiefs of Awukugua
- Honouree, Leading International Style Influencer - FashionGHANA Honours & Awards, 29 March 2019

== Personal life ==
She is a mother of two children.
