= Sprite Ball Championship =

Sports competition

The Sprite Ball Championship is an annual inter-high schools basketball tournament in Ghana. Its objective is to unearth talents and develop existing ones amongst the high schools in Ghana. It is organized by the RiteSport, a sports management group in Ghana.

== History ==
The Sprite Ball Championship began on 2 January 1998 at the Aviation Social Center, Accra. It commenced with over thirty Senior High Schools participating in the competition. Since its inception, it has been played in eight regions namely, Greater Accra. Ashanti, Western, Eastern, Brong Ahafo, Northern, Central and Volta regions. It has engaged over 300 Senior High Schools with an annual attendance of between 5,000-10,000 spectators.

== Seasons ==
=== 2 January 2007 ===
==== Boys Divisions ====
Achimota School won the championship, while St. Augustine's College finished as runners-up and Oda Senior High School placed third.

==== Girls Divisions ====
Winning team was St Mary's Senior High School while Runner up were not listed and Second runner up were not listed.

=== 2 January 2008 ===
==== Boys Divisions ====
Presbyterian Boys' Secondary School won the championship, while Achimota School finished as runners-up and SOS International Tema placed third.

==== Girls Divisions ====
Winning team was Wesley Girls Senior High School while Runner up were not listed and Second runner up were not listed.

=== 21--22 December 2009 ===
==== Boys Divisions ====
Winning team was Armed Forces Secondary Technical School while Runner up were Koforidua Secondary Technical School and Second runner up were Opoku Ware School.

==== Girls Divisions ====
Winning team was Sacred Heart Senior High School while Runner up were Wesley Girls High School and Second runner up were Insaaniya.

=== 22-23 December 2010 ===
==== Boys Divisions ====
Winning team was Mfantsipim School while Runner up were Prempeh College and Second runner up were Koforidua Secondary Technical School.

==== Girls Divisions ====
Winning team was Sacred Heart Senior High School while Runner up were Aggrey Memorial and Second runner up were Yaa Asantewaa Secondary School.

=== 2011-2012 (Sprite Ball @ 5) ===
==== Boys Divisions ====
Winning team was Mfantsipim School while Runner up were Keta Senior High and Second runner up were Koforidua Secondary Technical School.

==== Girls Divisions ====
Winning team was Yaa Asantewaa Secondary School while Runner up were Tema Senior High and Second runner up were Sacred Heart Senior High.

=== 2012/2013 ===
==== Boys Divisions ====
Winning team was Mfantsipim School while Runner up were Koforidua Secondary Technical School and Second runner up were Ghana Secondary Technical School.

==== Girls Divisions ====
Winning team was Yaa Asantewaa Secondary School while Runner up were Tema Senior High and Second runner up were Sacred Heart Senior High.

=== 2014 ===
==== Boys Divisions ====
Winning team was Keta Senior High School while Runner up were Presbyterian Boys' Secondary School and Second runner up were Opoku Ware School.

==== Girls Divisions ====
Winning team was TI Amass while Runner up were Aggrey Memorial and Second runner up were Mfantseman Girls.

=== 2015 ===
==== Boys Divisions ====
Winning team was Mfantsipim School while Runner up were Keta Senior High and Second runner up were Opoku Ware School.

==== Girls Divisions ====
Winning team was TI Amass while Runner up were Aggrey Memorial and Second runner up were Mfantseman Girls.

=== 2016 ===
==== Boys Divisions ====
Winning team was St Augustine's College while Runner up were Mfantsipim School and Second runner up were Pope John Senior High School and Minor Seminary.

==== Girls Divisions ====
Winning team was Aggrey Memorial while Runner up were Accra Wesley Girls and Second runner up were TI Amass.

=== 2016/2017 (Sprite Ball @ 400) ===
==== Boys Divisions ====
Winning team was Opoku Ware School while Runner up were Mfantsipim School and Second runner up were St. John's School, Sekondi.

==== Girls Divisions ====
Winning team was Wesley Girls Senior High School while Runner up were Kumasi Girls Senior High School and Second runner up were Aggrey Memorial.

=== 2018 ===
==== Boys Divisions ====
Winning team was Presbyterian Senior High School, Osu while Runner up were Mfantsipim School and Second runner up were Pope John Senior High School and Minor Seminary.

==== Girls Divisions ====
Winning team was Kumasi Girls Senior High School while Runner up were Accra Wesley Girls and Second runner up were Ahantaman Girls Senior High School.

=== 2019 ===
==== Boys Divisions ====
Winning team was Mfantsipim School while Runner up were West Africa Senior High School and Second runner up were Opoku Ware School.

=== 2020 ===
==== Girls Divisions ====
Winning team was Shama Senior High School while Runner up were St. Louis Senior High School and Second runner up were Kumasi Girls Senior High School.

== Boys Winners ==
SEASON	WINNER	FIRST RUNNER-UP	SECOND RUNNER-UP
2007	Achimota School	St Augustine's College	Oda Senior High School
2008	Presbyterian Boys' Secondary School	Achimota School	SOS International Tema
2009	Armed Forces Secondary Technical School	Koforidua Secondary Technical School	Opoku Ware School
2010	Mfantsipim School	Prempeh College	Koforidua Secondary Technical School
2011-2012	Mfantsipim School	Keta Senior High	Koforidua Secondary Technical School
2012/2013	Mfantsipim School	Koforidua Secondary Technical School	Ghana Secondary Technical School
2014	Keta Senior High School	Presbyterian Boys' Secondary School	Opoku Ware School
2015	Mfantsipim School	Keta Senior High	Opoku Ware School
2016	St Augustine's College	Mfantsipim School	Pope John Senior High School and Minor Seminary
2016/2017	Opoku Ware School	Mfantsipim School	St. John's School, Sekondi
2018	Presbyterian Senior High School, Osu	Mfantsipim School	Pope John Senior High School and Minor Seminary
2019	Mfantsipim School	West Africa Senior High School	Opoku Ware School

There was no winner for the 2020 edition as the winning school Keta Business College, fielded unqualified players. This resulted in them being stripped of the title after investigations exposed the irregularity. They were also banned indefinitely from the competition.

== Girls Winners ==
SEASON	WINNER	FIRST RUNNER-UP	SECOND RUNNER-UP
2007	St Mary's Senior High School		
2008	Wesley Girls SeniorHigh School		
2009	Sacred Heart Senior High School	Wesley Girls High School	Insaaniya
2010	Sacred Heart Senior High School	Aggrey Memorial	Yaa Asantewaa Secondary School
2011-2012	Yaa Asantewaa Secondary School	Tema Senior High	Sacred Heart Senior High
2012-2013	Aggrey Memorial	St Mary's Senior High School	Yaa Asantewaa Secondary School
2014	TI Amass	Aggrey Memorial	Mfantseman Girls
2015	TI Amass	Aggrey Memorial	Mfantseman Girls
2016	Aggrey Memorial	Accra Wesley Girls	TI Amass
2016/2017	Wesley Girls Senior High School	Kumasi Girls Senior High School	Aggrey Memorial
2018	Kumasi Girls Senior High School	Accra Wesley Girls	Ahantaman Girls Senior High School
2020	Shama Senior High School	St. Louis Senior High School	Kumasi Girls Senior High School

== Sponsors ==
- Coca-Cola Company Ghana
- Sprite Ghana
