= Rita Korankye Ankrah =

Ghanaian counsellor and minister (born 1962)

- Born: 23 May 1962 (age 64)
- Education: St Mary's Secondary School
- Alma mater: Ghana Institute of Management and Public Administration
- Occupations: Pastor, Marriage counsellor, Career guidance advisor
- Organization: Royalhouse Chapel International
- Known for: Spouse to Sam Korankye Ankrah
- Title: Premier Lady of the Royalhouse Chapel International
- Spouse: Sam Korankye Ankrah (m.1986)
- Children: 4

Rita Korankye Ankrah (born 23 May 1962) is a Ghanaian career guidance adviser, marriage counsellor, minister and motivational speaker. She is the Founder and President of Royal Ladies Ministries International. She is married to the Apostle General of the Royalhouse Chapel International, Sam Korankye Ankrah, therefore serving in the role of '' Premier Lady'' of the church which she co-founded with her husband.

== Early life and education ==
Born on 23 May 1962, Ankrah is an Akan with her father being a native of Akrokerri in the Ashanti Region and her mother from Wassa-Akropong in the Western Region. She was born and bred in Chorkor, a town in the central part of Accra in the Greater Accra Region. Whilst growing up, she was a Catholic and hoped on being a Catholic nun which influenced her in spending part of her school vacation in a Catholic Convent in Agomeya. She started basic school at St. Theresa's School at Kaneshie in Accra. She had her secondary school education at St. Mary's Secondary School, Accra, Ghana completing in 1981.

After completing St. Mary's she proceeded to Zion College where she rewrote her GCE ordinary level. After completion, she enrolled at Accra Technical University then Accra Polytechnic to study for a diploma in Business Studies from 1983 to 1985. She holds other diplomas in Counselling & Psychology, and Entrepreneurial Studies. Whilst working as a full-time minister along with her husband, at the age of 41, she enrolled at Ghana Institute of Management and Public Administration (GIMPA) for a bachelor's degree programme in Business Entrepreneurship and Management completing in 2006. She furthered her education again at GIMPA completing with a master's degree in Governance and Leadership in 2010.

== Career ==
=== Royalhouse Chapel International ===
Whilst her husband, Sam travelled to Netherlands to study, he had a spiritual encounter on 19 June 1991, where God told him to return to ministry full-time in Ghana. Before he returned to Ghana in November 1992, he gave her the approval to start Sunday services with members of the Showers of Blessings, which took place at the GES Model Nursery School in Accra with 12 adults and 12 children attending the first Sunday service.

She is the Founder and President of Royal Ladies Ministries International, the women's wing of the Royalhouse Chapel International, which she founded in 1994. She worked in the banking sector for 10 years before quitting her job to enter into full time ministry with her husband in 1998.

=== Other ventures ===
Ankrah runs other businesses aside from serving in the Royalhouse Chapel International Ministry, including a catering and event planning service.

== Personal life ==
In 1982, Rita met her husband, Sam Korankye Ankrah whilst he was on evangelism duty in her school at Zion College. They got married on 6 September 1986 when she was 24 years. The couple have four children: Nana Akos, Paapa, Naa Dromo and Mawuena. In 2016, the couple celebrated their 30th Marriage Anniversary.

== See also ==
- Sam Korankye Ankrah
