= Zion Senior High School =

High school in Ghana

Zion College

Location
- Anloga, Volta Region, Ghana
- Coordinates: 5°48′24.99″N 0°53′14.71″E

Information
- Other name: Zion College of West Africa
- Former name: New Africa University College
- Type: Public
- Established: 1937; 89 years ago
- Founder: Rev. Dr. Ferdinand Kwasi Fiawoo

Zion Senior High School, also referred to as Zion College of West Africa (ZICO), is a public senior high school located in Anloga in the Volta Region of Ghana. It was established in 1937 as the New Africa University College by Rev. Dr. Ferdinand Kwasi Fiawoo. ZICO is the oldest second cycle institution in the Volta Region.

Ghanaian poet Kofi Awoonor was an alumnus of Zion College. Other alumni of Zion College include renowned lawyer Sam Okudzeto, Akenten Appiah-Menkah, Hans Kofi Boni, Capt. Joel Sowu, Dr. Nyaho Tamakloe and Rita Korankye Ankrah.
