= Dzifa Affainie =

Ghanaian television presenter and anchor

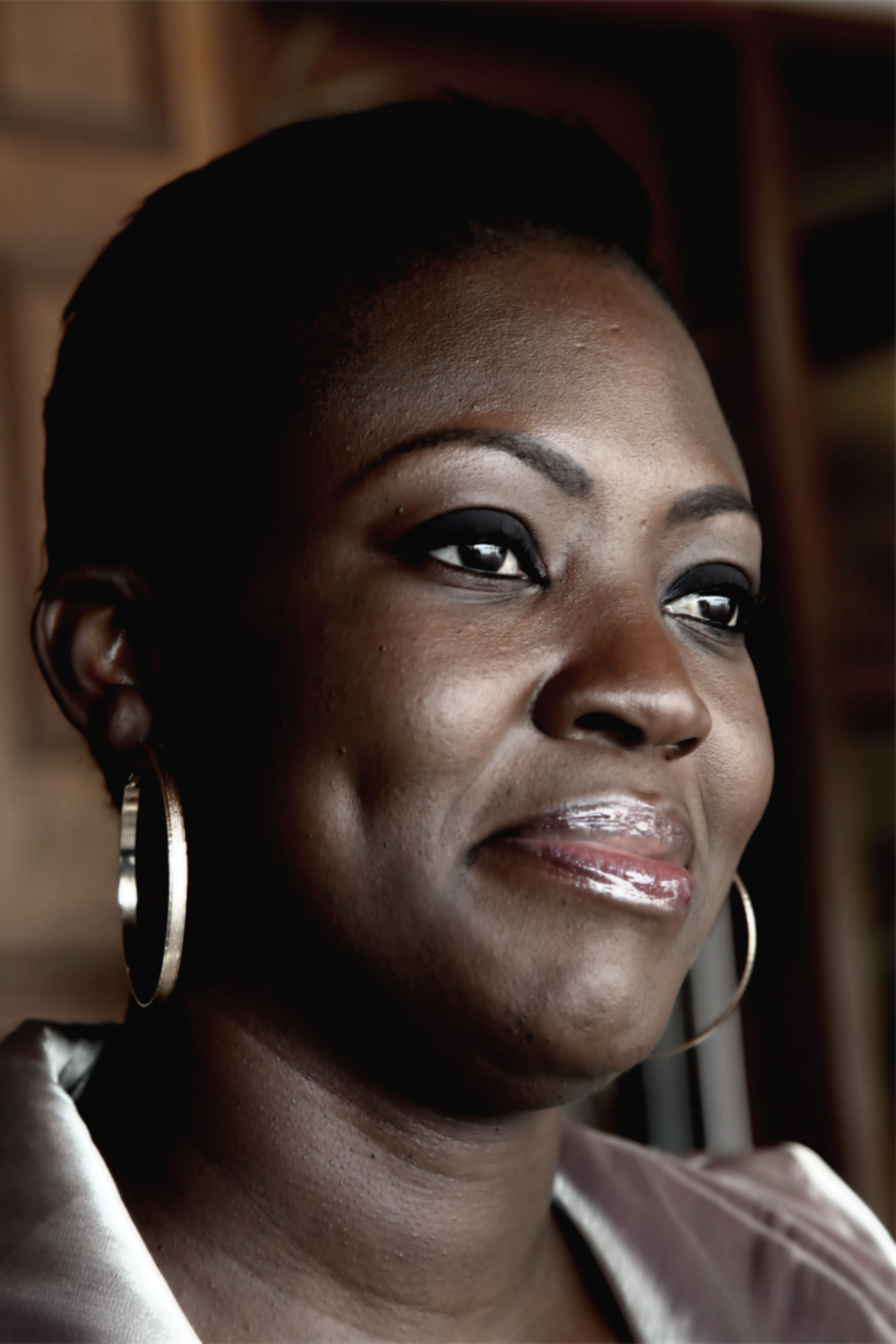
- Born: Deborah Dzifa Klu; Accra, Ghana
- Occupations: Television Presenter and Director, IF Media Consult
- Website: dzifaaffaine.com

Dzifa Affainie (née Smith) is a Ghanaian television presenter and anchor. She was the host of show The Late Nite Celebrity Show on e.tv Ghana.

== Early life and education ==
Affainie was born with the name Deborah Dzifa Klu. Her father later changed the family name to Smith. Affainie had both her early education and secondary education at the St. Mary's Secondary School in Korle Gonno, Accra, where she learned the fundamentals of her trade.

== Career ==
Affainie started her television career in the mid-1990s on Teen Beat on Ghana Television (GTV), where she excelled and won the hearts of many Ghanaians as a teenage TV celebrity. In 2001 at the age of 21, she joined Top Radio as a radio presenter presenting the News and other programmes. In 2003, she moved to TV Africa under the tutelage of Ghana's most celebrated filmmaker Kwaw Ansah. She was the Anchor of TV Africa's prime-time news, Host of TV Africa's celebrated programme Obaa Mbo and also host of Day Break, the station's morning programme.

In 2010, she joined E.tv Ghana as a guest host on 'Celebrity Soccer' a programme created for the 2010 World Cup. After the world cup, she went on to anchor E.tv Ghana's award-winning programme The Late Nite Celebrity Show. She conducted interviews with high-profile celebrities in Ghana and beyond, and her wittiness is legendary. She took on the showbiz name DzifAffainie whilst she was the host of the Late Nite Celebrity Show. In January 2014, she left E.tv Ghana and teamed up with award-winning television producer Jot Agyeman to produce her own television show Unplugged with Dzifa, a 26-part TV experience created to highlight the movers and shakers in Ghana and Africa. Unplugged with Dzifa is a co-production between IF Media Consult and the Institute of Media Practice.

== Personal life ==
Affainie has 5 daughters.

== Honours and awards ==
Affainie has won several awards including Television Presenter of the year 2007 at the Ghana Cultural Awards, Most Promising Television Presenter at the RTP Awards in 2011.
