= Sandra Don-Arthur =

Ghanaian makeup artist

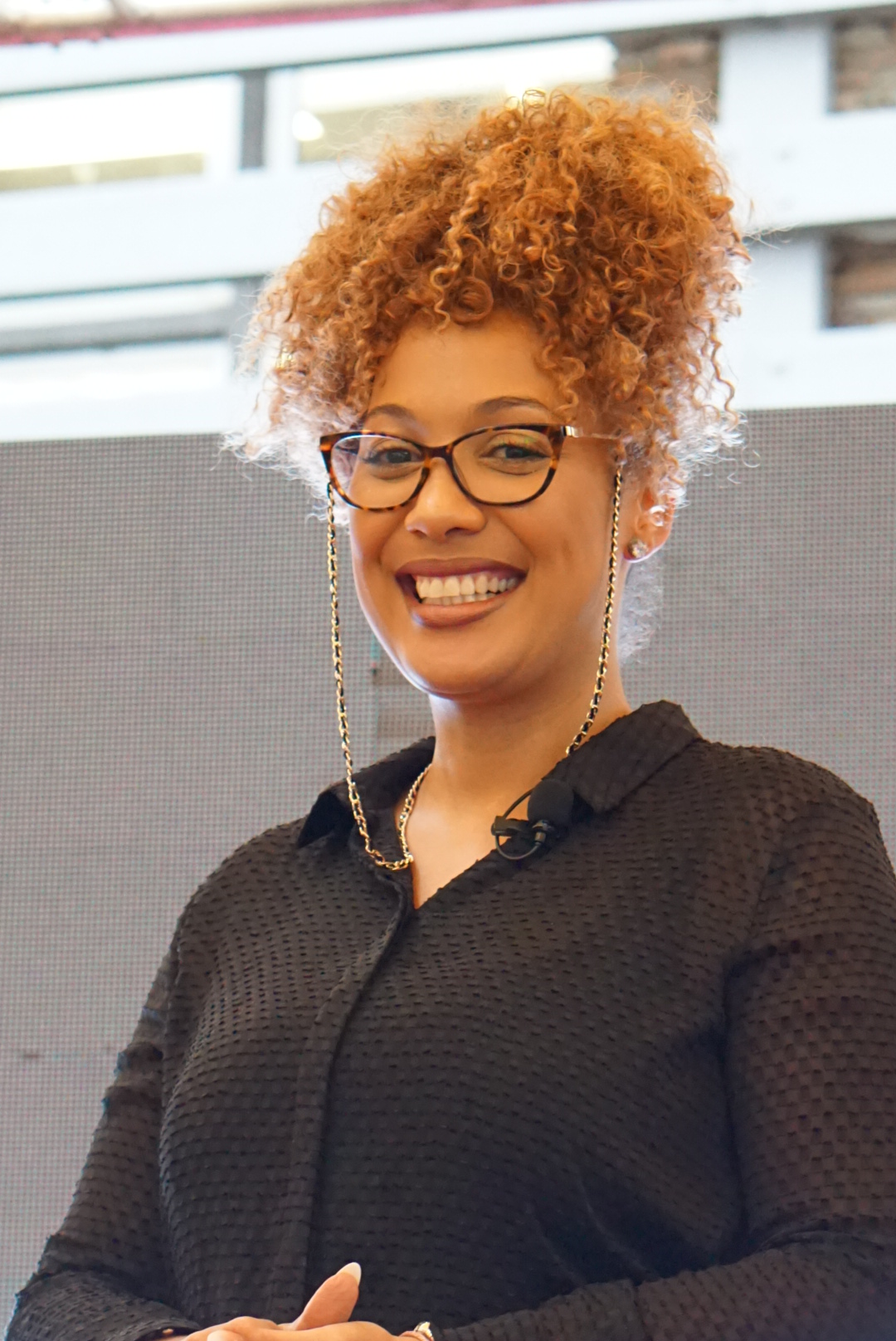
- Born: April 22, 1980 (age 46); Ghana
- Education: St. Roses Secondary School
- Alma mater: Ashesi University
- Occupations: Makeup artist; Creative director; Beauty Vlogger
- Years active: 2011–present
- Children: 2
- Parent(s): Eric George Alexander Don-Arthur (father); Natalia Don-Arthur (mother)
- Relatives: Eric Don-Arthur

Sandra Don-Arthur (born 22 April 1980) is a professional makeup artist and Vlogger from Ghana. She is the founder and C.E.O of Alexiglam Studio, a Ghanaian makeup and beauty company that provides beauty services to women in Ghana.

== Early life and education ==
She was born to a Ghanaian architect father, Eric George Alexander Don-Arthur and a Russian mother, Natalia Don-Arthur who is a biochemist. She grew up in both Ghana and Russia with her 4 siblings and is the younger sister of Eric Don-Arthur, the 2016 National Democratic Congress Parliamentary Candidate for the Effutu Constituency.

Don-Arthur attended Morning Star School in Cantonments and moved to St. Roses Senior High School in Akwatia. Later, she left to the United Kingdom to study at the West London College and in 2011 proceeded to Mink Cosmetics where she graduated with a certificate in makeup artistry, hair styling and special effects. She is an alumna of the Ashesi University in Ghana.

== Career ==
In 2011, Alexandrina started makeup professionally after completing courses in the UK. Her work as a makeup artist came to the limelight when the lead makeup artist asked her to do the makeup for the managing director of MNET Africa, Biola Alabi as a guest on the '@ Home With...' TV Show in London.

Don-Arthur has worked on a number of celebrities in both the Ghanaian and Nigerian entertainment industry such as Omotola Jalade Ekehinde, Efya, Joselyn Dumas, Juliet Ibrahim, Nadia Buari, Jackie Appiah, Jim Iyke, Yvonne Okoro and DJ Cuppy.

She was selected by Maybelline New York, Ghana as part of their board of influencers to help influence Maybelline's activities in Ghana. Maybelline New York also gave her the opportunity to host Africa's first dedicated makeup TV show, “Makeup Diaries,” which aired on DSTV in 46 countries.

She was also a regular guest and the lead makeup artist on the first season of "Keeping It Real" a show hosted by Ghanaian Actress and Host, Joselyn Dumas where modern Ghanaian women shared their views on various topics affecting them in 2017. She has created makeup editorials for magazines Glitz Africa, Debonair Afrik, Dream Wedding, and Haute Canoe working alongside Ghanaian photographer Gilbert Asante on these sets.

In 2015, she paid tribute to the late Kofi Ansah in partnership with Maybelline New York via her Haute Avant Garde collection that featured clothes from the legendary Ghanaian designer and creative makeup to showcase the diverse range of Maybelline New York products.

She was selected as the only Ghanaian makeup artist and West African representative to take part in the New York Fashion Week and worked with Victoria's Secret model, Mayowa Nicholas, Sabah Koj during the Fall/Winter shows. In 2019, she launched her beauty brand and academy, Alexiglam Studios to help promote the African beauty narrative and train young makeup artists.

She's attributed her growth as a makeup artist to her inquisitive nature as a child and her love for exploring new things. Pat McGrath and Bimpe Onakoya are a few of her mentors in the beauty industry.

== Notable works ==
A number of Ghanaian political figures have also been touched by Alexandrina's expert hands, including Former First Lady of Ghana, Nana Konadu Agyeman-Rawlings, Ursula Owusu, Nana Oye Lithur, Ghana's first Female Chief of Staff, Frema Osei Opare and Foreign Affairs minister, Shirley Ayorkor Botchway.

During the royal visit of Charles, Prince of Wales and his wife, Camilla, Duchess of Cornwall to Ghana in November 2018, a state banquet with a mini-fashion show was held in their honor and Don-Arthur was appointed as lead make-up artist for the show. Her editorial work on the face of Ghanaian-Nigerian international model, Victoria Michaels was featured in Paris-based, Roots Magazine.

== Philanthropy ==
She co-founder of Sickle Strong Warriors Foundation, a non-profit organization which seeks to raise awareness on sickle-cell and foster unity among sickle-cell patients in Ghana.

As part of her CSR and philanthropic works, she also learnt her expertise to the Fair Justice Initiative project, ‘Remember Me’. It was a collaborative project between Ghanaian photographer, Francis Kokoroko, Rania Odaymat, and The Fair Justice Initiative focused on twelve women who had been sentenced to life in prison at the Nsawam Prisons. The women's prison attire were replaced with traditional clothing and their photos taken which was showcased at the 'Make Be' exhibition at La Maison in October 2018. It has since been developed into a coffee table book to promote advocacy.

== Personal life ==
She lives in Accra, Ghana with her two kids.

== Awards and nominations ==
Year	Event	Prize	Result
2016	Ghana Makeup Awards	Best Editorial Makeup Artist	Won
2018	Ghana Makeup Awards	Best Makeup Artist	Won
2018	Young Entrepreneurs Awards	Excellence in Makeup Artistry	Won
