= Ophelia Crossland =

Ghanaian fashion designer and businesswoman

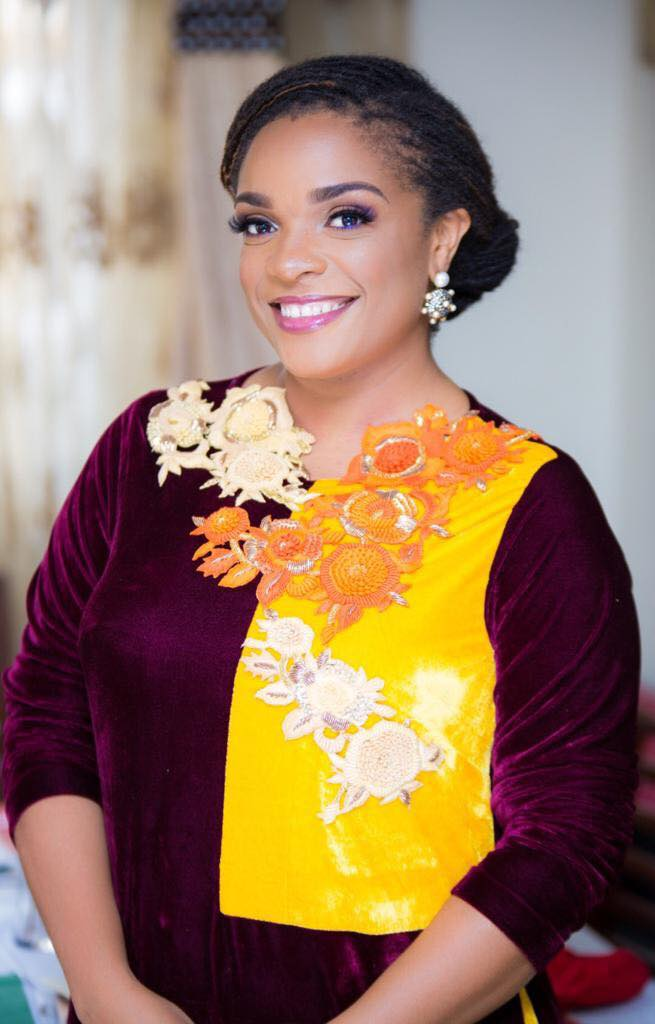
- Ophelia Crossland is a Ghanaian fashion designer
- Born: 16 March 1983; Osu, Ghana
- Occupations: Fashion Designer, Creative Director
- Spouse: Kofi Okyere Darko
- Children: 2

Ophelia Akweley Okyere-Darko (born March 16, 1983) (née Crossland) is a Ghanaian fashion designer and the Creative Director of Ophelia Crossland Designs Ltd and Ohemaa Kids. Those Who Inspire Limited named her as part of the 75 'Most Inspiring Ghanaians in the world.

== Early life ==
Ophelia Crossland was born to Ghanaian Archaeologist Prof. Leonard Brighton Crossland and Mrs Sarah Crossland and grew up in Accra with her twin brother and her elder sister Velma Owusu-Bempah. She attended St Mary's Senior High School (Ghana) in Korle Gonno, Accra and proceeded to the Vogue Style School of Fashion and Design by Joyce Ababio where she was adjudged best graduating student in 2004.

== Career ==
Ophelia Crossland started her fashion career in 2004 and has made clothes for prominent personalities in Ghana including the former Speaker of Parliament, Joyce Bamford-Addo, the Chief Justice Georgina Theodora Woods, former First Lady Nana Konadu Agyeman-Rawlings, Gifty Anti, and Joselyn Dumas.

She was named as Swarovski's West African Ambassador in 2017. Swarovski selected her to represent Ghana at their Fashion Exhibition in Dubai. She also costumed outfits for the cast of Shirley Frimpong Manso’s Love Or Something Like That in 2014.

She was also credited with the making of the gown Ghana's Miss Universe representative wore on the night of the finals in Thailand.

In September 2019, Crossland was announced as Africa and Ghana's sole representative at the Global Qipao Invitational Exhibition at the China National Silk Museum Hangzhou, Zhejiang Province. The theme for the 2019 exhibition was "Weddings" and she created the qipao with Ghana's Kente.

Vogue Italia also featured her charity work with Ghanaian head porters popularly known as Kayayei in fashion.

== Personal life ==
She is married to Ghanaian Broadcaster and fashion designer, Kofi Okyere Darko (KOD) and they have two daughters.

== Awards ==
Womenswear designer of the Year at the 2018 Glitz Style Awards

She also won the best wardrobe and costume designer for her work with Love Or Something Like That at the Ghana Movie Awards.

Winner of the Swarovski Training Workshop Award and Swarovski Brand Ambassador
