= United Nations Technology Bank for Least Developed Countries =

The United Nations Technology Bank for Least Developed Countries was established as a subsidiary organ of the UN General Assembly on 23 December 2016 by the United Nations resolution 71/251 to support Least Developed Countries (LDCs) to strengthen their science and technology and innovation (STI) capacities.

The Technology Bank currently serves 44 LDCs and former LDCs for up to five years after they graduate from the category.

== Origin ==
In the Istanbul Programme of Action (IPoA) for the Least Developed Countries (LDCs) for the Decade 2011–2020, adopted in 2011, the Least Developed Countries called for the establishment of a "Technology Bank and Science, Technology and Information supporting mechanism, dedicated to least developed countries which would help improve least developed countries' scientific research and innovation base, promote networking among researchers and research institutions, help least developed countries access and utilize critical technologies, and draw together bilateral initiatives and support by multilateral institutions and the private sector, building on the existing international initiatives."

On 23 December 2016, the UN General Assembly adopted resolution 71/251 to establish the Technology Bank for the Least Developed Countries. By that resolution, the Assembly established the Technology Bank as a subsidiary organ of the General Assembly and adopted its Charter (71/363).

In the same resolution, the Assembly invited the Member States and other stakeholders to provide voluntary funding to the trust fund for the operationalization of the Technology Bank. An agreement was signed on 22 September 2017 between the United Nations and Türkiye on financial and in-kind support of the Technology Bank. The Turkish Government committed to provide the Bank with $2 million annually for five years.

On 4 June 2018, the premises of the Technology Bank in Gebze, outside of Istanbul, Türkiye were formally inaugurated by the UN Deputy Secretary-General, Amina J. Mohammed, and the Bank's first managing director, Joshua Phoho Setipa, who was subsequently appointed in December 2018.

The creation of the Technology Bank was an objective of the LDC as proven in the Addis Ababa Action Agenda of the 3rd International Conference on Financing for Development and the 2030 Agenda for Sustainable Development. The operation of the Technology Bank for the LDC fulfilled target 17.8 of the Sustainable Development Goals.

The Doha Programme of Action for the Least Developed Countries (2022-2031) renewed and strengthened commitments between the least developed countries and their development partners, including the private sector, civil society, and governments at all levels. It was adopted during the first part of the LDC5 conference on March 17, 2022 and endorsed by the General Assembly through resolution A/RES/76/258 on April 1. The Doha Programme of Action for LDCs endorsed the UN Technology Bank as "a focal point for the Least Developed Countries to strengthen their science, technology and innovation capacity towards building sustainable productive capacities and promoting structural economic transformation."

== Mandate ==
The core mission of the Technology Bank is to support LDCs to strengthen their science, technology, and innovation (STI) capacities, including the capacity to identify, absorb, develop, integrate and scale up the deployment of technologies and innovations, including indigenous ones, as well as the capacity to address and manage intellectual property rights issues to enhance their STI capacity.

The UN Technology Bank provides LDCs with a voice to chart their development through (A/71/363):

- Supporting LDCs to assess and articulate their needs through country-led technology needs assessments
- Strengthening science, technology, and innovation capacity in LDCs to respond to challenges and opportunities towards achieving the SDGs
- Facilitating access to appropriate technologies through technology transfer and providing access to research and technical knowledge
- Strengthening partnerships and coordination of STI between LDCs and relevant STI stakeholders

== List of Managing Directors ==
- Joshua Phoho Setipa (2018 - 2022)
- Taffere Tesfachew (2022 - 2024) - as an Acting Managing Director
- Deodat Maharaj (2024 - 2026)
- Roland Mollerus (2026 - Present) - as an Acting Managing Director

== Key Documents ==
- GA Resolution Establishing the Bank (A/RES/71/251)
- Charter of the Technology Bank for the Least Developed Countries (A/71/363)
- Supporting the operationalization of the Technology Bank for the Least Developed Countries: 3-year Strategic Plan
- Programme of Action for the Least Developed Countries for the Decade 2011-2020
- Review of the First Three Years of the Technology Bank for the Least Developed Countries (A/76/272)
