= Sam Korankye Ankrah =

Ghanaian minister and televangelist (born 1960)

Apostle Reverend Sam Korankye Ankrah
- Born: 23 February 1960 (age 66)
- Education: University of Ghana
- Occupations: Apostle General, Founder & General Overseer of the Royalhouse Chapel International
- Years active: 1993-Present
- Organization: Royalhouse Chapel International
- Spouse: Rev. Mrs. Rita Korankye Ankrah
- Children: Nana Akos, Paapa, Naa Dromo and Mawuena
- Parent(s): J. O. Ankrah and Victoria Ziddah

Reverend Sam Korankye Ankrah (born 23 February 1960) is a Ghanaian minister and televangelist who serves as the Apostle General of the Royalhouse Chapel International, a church in Ghana with more than 30,000 members. He is also the first vice president of the Ghana Pentecostal and Charismatic Council.

== Early life and education ==
Reverend Ankrah was born to J. O. Ankrah and Victoria Ziddah on 23 February 1960, the 22nd of his polygamous father’s 24 children and the fifth of his mother’s seven children. His mother, a Presbyterian, had him baptized as Samuel in the Presbyterian church. He attended Accra High School and St. John’s Grammar School in Accra and was inspired to pursue a career in religion following a visit by the evangelistic group Joyful Way Incorporated. He later attended the University of Ghana, where he started the Showers of Blessing Incorporated (SOBI) evangelistic ministry in 1984. He also holds certificates in Christian Leadership, from Haggai Institute in Singapore and Management and Entrepreneurship from the Ghana Institute of Management and Public Administration (GIMPA).

== Career ==
=== Royalhouse Chapel International ===
Following his studies, Korankye Ankrah travelled to the Netherlands, where he had a spiritual experience on 19 June 1991, where God told him to return to ministry full-time in Ghana. Before his return to Ghana in November 1992, he had given approval for his wife, Rev. Mrs. Rita Korankye Ankrah, to start Sunday services with members of the Showers of Blessings, which took place at the GES Model Nursery School in Accra with 12 adults and 12 children attending the first Sunday service.

Korankye Ankrah assumed leadership of the church in January 1993, when membership grew from 30 to 150 adults, leading to the church relocating to the Agricultural Development Bank (ADB) canteen in 1994 and to its own property in November 2000. As at that time, the church membership had grown to about 5,000. After 10 years at Bank for Housing and Construction (Accra Ghana), Ankrah's wife joined Royalhouse Chapel International as a full-time minister in 1998, and was named Premier Lady of the organization. Today the church has about 30,000 members, with 120 local assemblies, 20 international missions, and departments including media ministries, church administration, a Christian Leadership College, and a department of social services.

In 2013, Ankrah revealed that God had told him that retired Ghanaian footballer and former captain of Ghana’s national football team Stephen Appiah would become a pastor. Appiah replied that he would consider pursuing a career as minister with the Royal House Chapel, of which he was a member."

=== Humanitarian works ===
Korankye Ankrah has created initiatives to address the problems of those in need. Programs he has founded include Outreach for Comfort, Rescue to the needy, Ministry to the Aged, Hospital and Prisons Outreaches and Scholarship Schemes for Bright but Needy Students.

== Controversy over wealth ==
In 2011, he was named by Ghana Nation as one of the wealthiest pastors in Ghana, with reporters noting that his children were schooled both home and abroad, and he lived "in a palace-like mansion at Sakaman a suburb of Dansoman in Accra", and that he had a "fleet of cars." He issued a statement, "I will not lie to you; say to the whole world that I say that by our position as men of God, we definitely attract blessings of which includes money, but for me it is the following and the people which is more important and the more we serve them, the more they show us kindness at the least opportunity."

== Affiliations ==
Korankye Ankrah serves as the first vice president of the Ghana Pentecostal and Charismatic Council (GPCC), which was formed in 1969. He is the CEO of Powerline Media Ministries, a non-profit organization with radio and television in Ghana as well as internationally. In addition, he is the founder of Covenant Ministers Fellowship Incorporated.

== Awards and honors ==
In 2008, Korankye Ankrah received the Order of the Volta award, one of Ghana's highest honors, from Ghana's president for his charitable work in the areas of health and education. In 2009, he received the Angel of the Year Award from Pristine Hub and TV Africa. In 2011, he received the William Seymour award for Excellence and Humility in Leadership from The Azusa Revival Directorate. In 2012, he was awarded with the Global Award for Apostolic/Pastoral Excellence by the Global Leadership Training Organisation, in recognition of his work to ensure integrity in leadership in the West African Sub-region. In 2013, he received an Honorary Award of the Humanitarian Services of the Year from the Excellent Leadership Awards Group (EXLA), for his humanitarian works.

== Personal life ==
Korankye Ankrah met his wife, Rev. Rita Korankye Ankrah, in 1982, and they were married in 1986. The couple have four children: Nana Akos, Paapa, Naa Dromo and Mawuena.

== Bibliography ==
The Rising of the Sun: Shining from Obscurity, Sam Korankye-Ankrah, Derek Amanor, Royalhouse Chapel International, 2010
