= Aisha Ayensu =

Ghanaian fashion designer

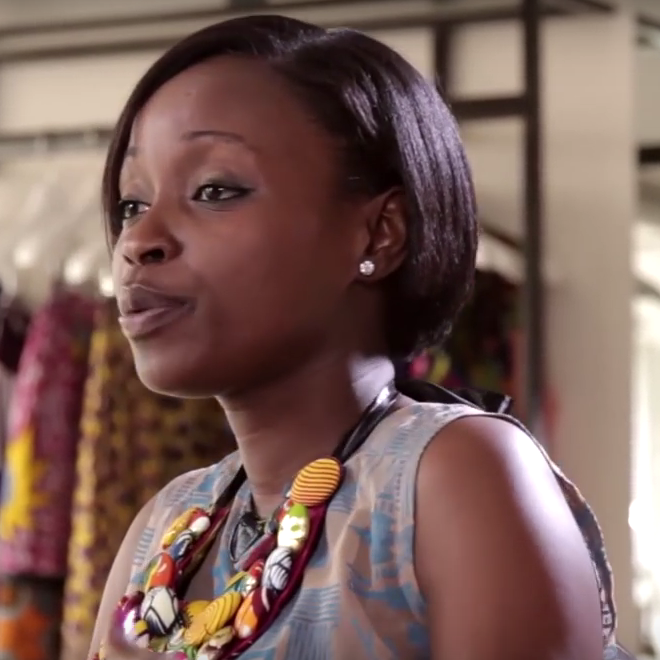
- Aisha Ayensu Christie Brown label creator from Ghana in 2008
- Born: Ghana
- Education: Achimota School; Joyce Ababio College of Creative Design
- Occupation: Fashion designer
- Known for: Christie Brown fashion house
- Awards: African Designer of the Year, Glitz Style Awards; Best Fashion Designer, Africa Prestigious Awards

Aisha Ayensu is a Ghanaian award-winning fashion designer who is known to have designed outfits and stage costumes for Beyonce, Genevieve Nnaji, Jackie Appiah and Sandra "Alexandrina" Don-Arthur. She is the founder and Creative Director of Christie Brown, a Ghanaian fashion house. She has been interviewed by Folu Storms and for the BBC World Service's radio programme In the Studio and was listed as one of Forbes' Most Promising Entrepreneurs in 2016.

== Education ==
Ayensu has a background in psychology and fashion. She had her secondary school education at Achimota School and her training in fashion from Joyce Ababio College of Creative Design.

== Career ==
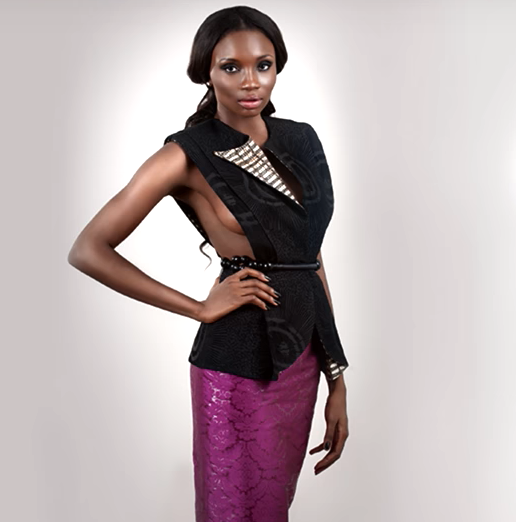
A Christie Brown design from 2014 (as featured on NdaniTV)

During her final year of bachelor in psychology that she launch her brand, born out of her passion for fashion, nurtured by her grandmother, a dressmaker.

With inspiration from her grandmother, she founded the fashion house and named it after her, "Christie Brown" in March 2008 in Ghana which is now recognised internationally. She has featured as "Platinum Standard" on NdaniTV in 2014 and she was interviewed by Folu Storms when she visited Accra in the New Africa series in 2016. She is the founder and Creative Director of Christie Brown, a Ghanaian fashion house. She was interviewed by Afua Hirsch for their programme "In the Studio" for the BBC World Service's radio programme in 2016. This was four months before her annual collection where she faces the "challenge of making her culture globally acceptable" and this celebrated her tenth year of being in business. She was also listed as one of Forbes' Most Promising Entrepreneurs in 2016.

== Awards ==
She has won several awards, which include:

- 2009 - Emerging Designer of the Year, Arise Africa fashion event in South Africa
- 2010 - Only Ghanaian label chosen to showcase in the Arise L'Afrique-á-Porter, in Paris during Paris Fashion Week
- 2018 - Best Fashion Designer, Africa Prestigious Awards
- 2018 - African Designer of the Year, Glitz Style Awards
- 2019 - African Designer of the Year, Glitz Style Awards
