= Joshua Phoho Setipa =

Lesotho politician

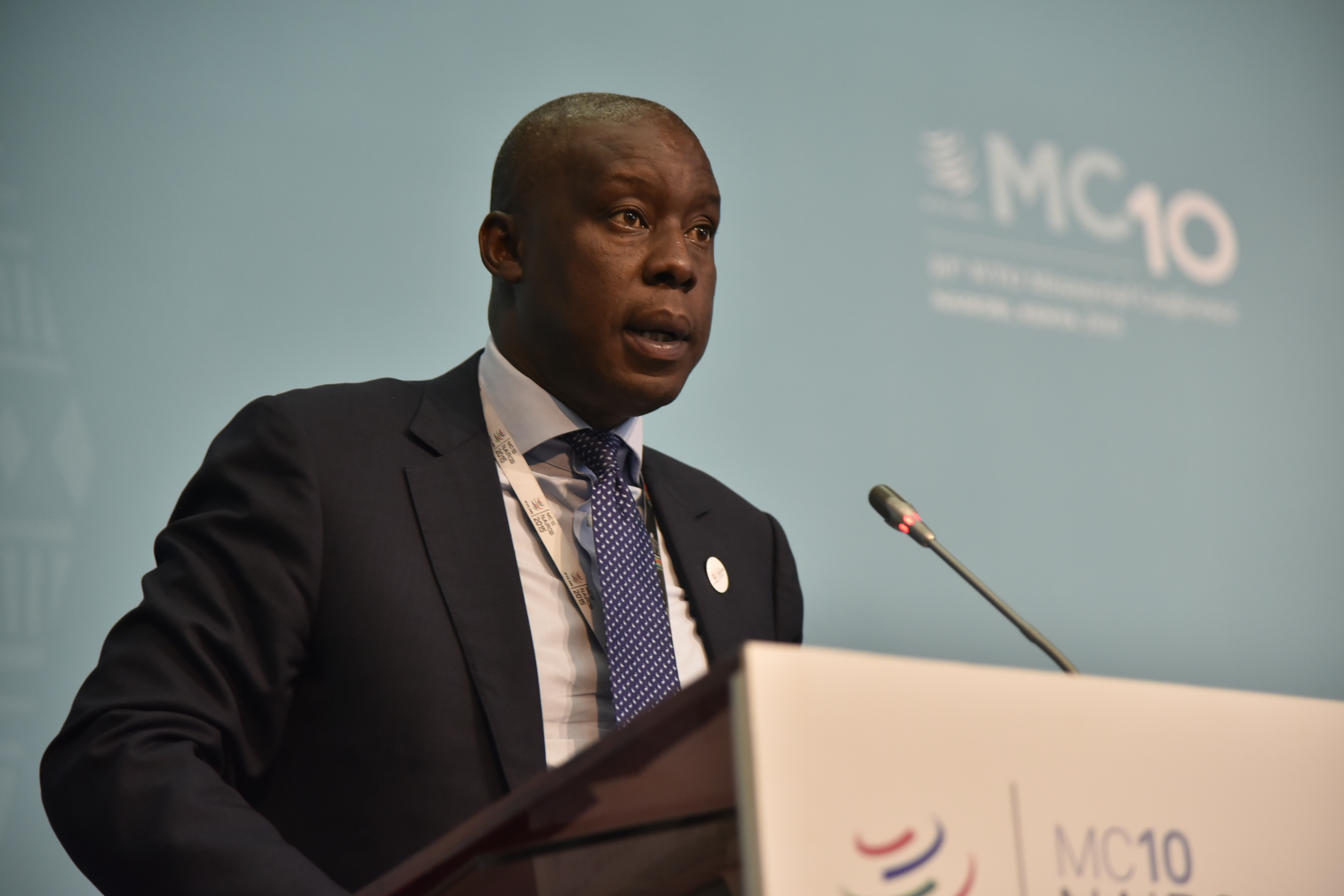
- Joshua Setipa at the WTO Ministerial Conference 2015

Minister of Trade and Industry
- In office March 2015 – 2017
- Monarch: Letsie III
- Prime Minister: Pakalitha Mosisili

Member of the Senate of Lesotho
- Incumbent
- Assumed office March 2015
- Appointed by: Letsie III

Personal details
- Born: 6 April 1969 (age 57)
- Citizenship: Lesotho
- Party: Revolution for Prosperity (RFP)
- Other political affiliations: Lesotho Congress for Democracy (LCD)

Joshua Phoho Setipa (born 6 April 1969), is a politician and diplomat from Lesotho who served as a senator in the Senate of Lesotho and minister for trade and industry from 2015-2017. He was managing director of the United Nations Technology Bank for Least Developed Countries from 2018 to 2022. Setipa is currently senior director for the Strategy, Portfolio, partnerships and Digital Directorate for the Commonwealth. He is a candidate for the next Commonwealth secretary-general.

== Early life, education and career ==
Setipa was born in Maseru, Lesotho. He completed a Bachelor of Arts (BA) in Public Administration and Political Science at the National University of Lesotho. He received a Graduate Diploma in International Relations and Trade from the Australian National University and completed a Master of Business Administration (MBA) at the University of Bradford. He attended the Executive Public Leaders Programme at the Blavatnik School of Government at the University of Oxford.

Before joining the government, Setipa served in the Lesotho Foreign Service from 1992 to 2003. He worked at the World Trade Organisation as a senior counsellor in the Office of the director general from 2005 to 2011. In January 2012, he was appointed CEO of the Lesotho National Development Cooperation, government agency tasked with promoting investment and implementing Lesotho’s industrial development policies. He resigned the post in April 2014.

== Political career ==
Setipa ran for the Lesotho National Assembly in the February 2015 snap elections in the Maseru #32 constituency (now Maseru Central). Setipa ran for the Lesotho Congress for Democracy party and was defeated by Lesego Makgothi. He was then nominated to the senate and made Minister of Trade and Industry for Lesotho in March 2015. In the June 2017 elections, Setipa ran again for the Lesotho Congress in Maseru.

Setipa worked as a senior consultant at the World Bank from 2017 to 2018 and was tasked with overseeing projects in the West African Region. From November 2018 until 2022, he was appointed the first managing director for the newly created UN Technology Bank for the Least Developed Countries. He left the post to run for parliament in the Semena #75 Constituency for the newly created Revolution for Prosperity Party in the 2022 Lesotho General Election.

In 2022, he joined the Commonwealth Secretariat as senior director of strategy, portfolio, partnerships and digital, and secretary to the board of governors.

In January 2024, the Government of Lesotho backed Setipa in his bid to become Commonwealth secretary-general. As of 1 May 2024, he is the only Southern African candidate running for the position which will be selected at the Heads of Government Meeting in Samoa in October 2024.

== Family Life ==
Setipa is married with three children.
