= Ekow Mensah =

Ghanaian social entrepreneur and speaker

Ekow Mensah is a Ghanaian social entrepreneur and speaker who is founder and CEO of The African Network of Entrepreneurs (TANOE).

== Early life ==
Mensah was born in Takoradi in the Western Region of Ghana. He has a degree in mathematics from the Kwame Nkrumah University of Science and Technology in Kumasi, Ghana.

== Career ==
As the CEO of The African Network of Entrepreneurs, he oversees 5 networks and 6 projects which are actively involved in various impact activities across Ghana. The African Network of Entrepreneurs holds a membership of over 1750 entrepreneurs across Africa primarily in Ghana, Nigeria, South Africa, Uganda, Liberia, Kenya and Zambia. He also recently launched Ghana's first creative arts hub and co-working space, known as the TANOE Hub which provides space and resources to creatives in Accra, Ghana.

Ekow was recently appointed by Premium Bank Ghana Ltd to head its HelpStation initiative and also chairs the Board of the Ghana Startup Awards. He was also an independent consultant with British Council Ghana and DwellWorks, USA and mentors participants of the Regional YALI West Africa programme and students of Ashesi University.

His article on President Donald Trump was highly published and recommended across Africa.

== Awards and recognition ==
In 2015, Mensah was ranked among the 50 Most Influential Young Ghanaians by Avance Media and was subsequently recognised by Coca-Cola among 60 Young Leaders in Ghana.
