= Shirley Ayorkor Botchwey =

Ghanaian politician and lawyer (born 1963)

Her Excellency The Honourable Shirley Ayorkor Botchwey
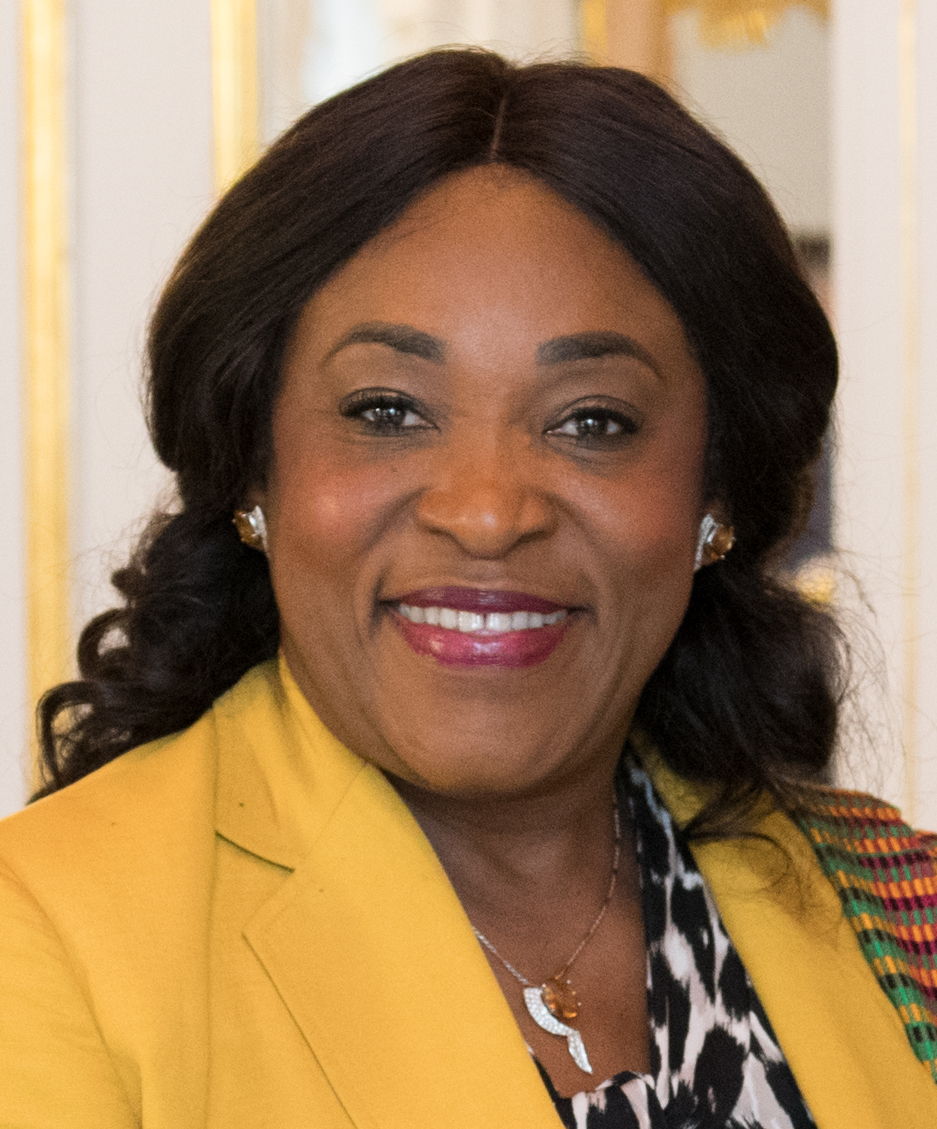
- Botchwey in 2018

7th Secretary-General of the Commonwealth of Nations
- Incumbent
- Assumed office 1 April 2025
- Head: Charles III
- Chair-in-Office: Fiamē Naomi Mataʻafa (Samoa); La'auli Leuatea Schmidt (Samoa); Gaston Browne (Antigua and Barbuda)
- Preceded by: The Baroness Scotland of Asthal

Minister for Foreign Affairs and Regional Integration
- In office 28 January 2017 – 7 January 2025
- President: Nana Akufo-Addo
- Preceded by: Hanna Tetteh
- Succeeded by: Samuel Okudzeto Ablakwa

Member of the Ghana Parliament for Anyaa Sowotuom
- In office 7 January 2013 – 7 January 2021
- President: John Mahama; Nana Akufo-Addo
- Preceded by: New constituency
- Majority: 4,545

Personal details
- Born: Shirley Ayorkor Botchwey; 8 February 1963 (age 63) Accra, Ghana
- Party: New Patriotic Party
- Children: 2
- Education: St Mary's Senior High School; University of Ghana; Ghana Institute of Journalism; Ghana Institute of Management and Public Administration
- Alma mater: University of London; University of Westminster
- Profession: Journalist, Politician, Diplomat

Shirley Ayorkor Botchwey (born 8 February 1963) is a Ghanaian politician, diplomat and lawyer who has served as the seventh secretary-general of the Commonwealth of Nations since 1 April 2025. At the time of her appointment, she was Ghana's Minister for Foreign Affairs and Regional Integration. She was appointed foreign minister by Ghanaian president Nana Akufo-Addo on 10 January 2017. Previously, she was a Member of Parliament for Anyaa-Sowutuom from 2013 to 2021 and had served as Deputy Minister of Foreign Affairs and a Minister of State at the Ministry of Water Resources, Works and Housing under John Kufuor. She is a member of the New Patriotic Party.

== Early life and education ==
Born in Accra, Ghana, Botchwey had her secondary education at St. Mary's Girls' Senior High School at Korle Gonno. She studied at the University of Ghana Business School, the Ghana Institute of Journalism (GIJ), Ghana Institute of Management and Public Administration (GIMPA), the Pitman's Central College, University of London and University of Westminster.

She holds an Executive MBA (Project Management option), MA in Public Communication, Bachelor of Law Degree (LLB), a Diploma in Public Relations and Advertising as well as a certificate in Marketing Management.

== Political career ==
Shirley Ayorkor Botchwey at Commonwealth Heads of Government meeting in 2026

In the John Agyekum Kufuor administration which ran between 2001 and 2009, Botchwey served in various portfolios including deputy minister for foreign affairs, deputy minister for information and deputy minister for trade and industries. She was a member of parliament for four terms, first representing Ghana's most populous constituency, Weija, and later, Anyaa/Sowutuom which was carved out of Weija before the 2012 elections. Botchwey chose not to run for a fifth term in Parliament in the 2020 Election.

At the party level, she served as spokesperson on foreign affairs between the year 2009 and 2013.

During the same period, she was Ranking Member for the Parliamentary Select Committee on Foreign Affairs and later, the Appointments, Defence and Interior Committees of Parliament.

A member of the ECOWAS Parliament from 2013 – 2017, she worked with her colleagues to assist the Community Parliament in its advisory role in considering matters concerning the region particularly on issues relating to fundamental human rights and freedom, while making recommendations to institutions and organs of ECOWAS. She also served as Vice Chair on the NEPAD & APRM Committees.

Before she called time on her sixteen years career as member of parliament, Shirley was a member of the Communications as well as the Gender and Children Committees of Parliament where she worked with colleague members to look into matters relating to communications and examined all gender and children focused issues to ensure their inclusion in all appropriate legislation. On 21 January 2021, she was nominated as the minister for Foreign Affairs and Regional Integration by the president of Ghana, Nana Akuffo-Addo.

On 26 October 2024, Botchwey was elected as Secretary-General of the Commonwealth of Nations at the 2024 Commonwealth Heads of Government Meeting in Samoa. Her tenure began on 1 April 2025. She is the first Ghanaian to hold the position.

== Business and legal career ==
Before entering into frontline politics, Botchwey ran a marketing and communications company where she was a consultant for the Ministry of Tourism. She was also the managing director of Dynacom Limited.

As a practitioner of public administration, she worked with various organizations such as Worldspace Ghana, the Divestiture Implementation Committee, Glaxo Group Research and Hodge Recruitment.

She became a lawyer in October 2023 when she was called to the bar as a barrister and solicitor in Ghana.

Botchwey was the Chairperson of ECOWAS Council of Ministers and the Minister for Foreign Affairs and Regional Integration of Ghana. She is the 7th Commonwealth Secretary-General, the first woman from the African continent in the role.

== Personal life ==
Shirley Ayorkor Botchwey is a single mother of two. She is an Anglican.

== See also ==
- List of foreign ministers in 2017
- List of current foreign ministers

Political offices
Preceded by Hanna Tetteh	Minister for Foreign Affairs; 28 January 2017 – 7 January 2025	Incumbent
