= Joyce Ababio =

Ghanaian fashion designer

- Born: Accra, Ghana
- Label: Kente Designs
- Children: Charles Nana Osei Ababio, Tracy Nana Yaa Ababio

Joyce Yeboah Ababio is a Ghanaian fashion designer. She is the founder and CEO of JACCD.

== Early life and education ==
Ababio was born to Stephen W. Yeboah, a politician who served under the Nkrumah government, and Esther Tuyee. She is the fifth child of her parents. She did her primary education at Datus School and then continued to Achimota School. She started her higher education at St. Cloud State University in Minnesota, United States. However, after a year studying medical technology, she transferred to Texas Woman's University, where she obtained a degree in fashion design.

== Career ==
After her tertiary education, she returned to Ghana. In 1995, she established the Vogue Style School of Fashion and Design. In 2013, she launched the Joyce Ababio College of Creative Design (JACCD) in Accra. She has been in charge of the costumes for various beauty pageant such as Miss Ghana and Miss World. She has groomed a number of Ghana designers.

== Awards and recognition ==
- Miss World Best Formal Evening Wear Award (1995)
- Ebony Award for Bridal and Pageantry (1999)
- Miss Ghana Best Evening Wear (2000)
- Ghana Fashion Awards Fashion Contribution Award in Education and Mentoring (2012 & 2015)
- Glitz Africa Fashion Week Lifetime Achievement Award (2013)
- Jandel Superwoman Award (2014)
- Nobles International Award (2014)
- 100 Most Outstanding Women 74th & 41st (2014 & 2015)
- Ghana Fashion Awards Hall of Fame (2016)
- Century International Quality ERA Award (2016)
- Glitz Women of the Year Fashion Force (2017)
- Lifetime in a Portrait Awards Initiator of Change (2017)
- Xperience Womanity Awards Fashion Education Icon (2019)
- Feminine Ghana Achievement Awards Best Achiever in Fashion, Jewelry and Lifestyle (2019)
- Ghana Feminine Hall of Fame (2019)
- Ghana Women of Distinction (2018)
- Those who Inspire (2019)

== Personal life ==
Ababio has two children named Tracy and Charles.

== See also. ==
- Kofi Ansah
