= Sandra Ankobiah =

Ghanaian lawyer

- Born: Sandra Ankobiah; May 18, 1983 (age 42); Ghana
- Education: University of Buckingham, Ghana School of Law
- Occupation: Barrister

Sandra Ankobiah (18 May 1983) is a Ghanaian lawyer, Managing Partner, SGA Legal, TV host and entrepreneur.

== Education ==
Sandra Ankobiah studied international and commercial law, with a specialization in world trade, from the University of Buckingham between 2005 and 2009. She returned to Ghana and studied at the Ghana School of Law from 2010 to 2012. In 2013 she became a Barrister and Solicitor of the Supreme Court of Ghana.

== Career ==
Ankobiah is the founder of TV production company, Emerald Paradise Enterprise. She is also the co-founder of SN Media Learning Tree, a provider of practical media training in Accra.

Ankobiah is the CEO of Emerald Energy Company Limited and the Executive Director of a non-profit organisation called The Women's Institute.

Ankobiah is the coordinator for The Legal Advocacy Foundation, an organization that aims to raise awareness about basic legal rights and obligations. In 2016, she was appointed by the Ministry of Youth and Sports as an ambassador for women's football in Ghana. Ankobiah is committed to raising funds, increasing awareness and patronage of the women's game. She also organizes education drives and empowerment initiatives for women.

== Awards and nominations ==
- 100 Most Influential Ghanaian Women 2016 (Women Rising)
