= Glitz Style Awards =

Annual award event in Ghana

Glitz Style Awards was established in 2015 by Claudia Lumor. The award is held annually in Ghana to showcase both Ghanaian and International individuals and businesses who have outstandingly contributed to the African fashion industry.

== Background ==
The first Glitz Style Awards ceremony took place in 2015 and was attended by Becca, Yvonne Nelson, Stephen Appiah, Wiyaala, The Event was hosted by Naa Ashorkor with music performances from Irene Logan.

== Categories ==
| # | Year | Venue | Host(s) | Categories | Winners |
|---|---|---|---|---|---|
| 1 | 2015 | Mövenpick Ambassador Hotel | Naa Ashorkor | Most Stylish TV Personality; Most Stylish Radio Personality; Most Stylish Movie Star; Most Stylish Music Star; Accessory Designer of the Year; Model of the Year; Best Dressed Celebrity on the Red Carpet; Red Carpet Designer of the Year; Designer of the Year; Fashion Blogger of the Year; Fashion Photographer of the Year; Most Stylish Sports Personality; Most Stylish Business Executive; Best Individual Style | Joselyn Dumas; Kofi Okyere Darko (KOD); Yvonne Nelson; Becca; Selina Bebaako-Mensah – Selina Beb; Prince Ibrahim; Sandra Ankobiah; Pistis; Oheneba Yaw Boahman – Abrantie; Afua Rida – styledbyrida.com; Emmanuel Bobbie; Stephen Appiah; Nana Asante Bediatuo; Wiyaala |
| 2 | 2016 | Mövenpick Ambassador Hotel | | Most Stylish Movie Star of the Year; Most Stylish TV Presenter; Red Carpet Designer of the Year; Best Dressed Celebrity on the Red Carpet; Fashion Icon of the Year; Best Individual Style; Model of the Year; Stylist of the Year; Fashion Photographer of the Year; Fashion blogger of the Year; Most Stylish Business Executive; Emerging designer of the Year; Most Stylish Radio Personality; Most stylish Music Artiste of the Year; Designer of the year | Zynnell Zuh; Berla Mundi; Sima Brew; Nana Akua Addo; Dr Joyce Aryee; M.anifest; Victoria Michaels; Kelvin Vincent; Gilbert Asante; Afua Rida; Nathan Kwabena Adisi aka Bola Ray; PAON; Berla Mundi; Efya; Charlotte Prive |
| 3 | 2017 | Mövenpick Ambassador Hotel | James Gardiner and Nikki Samonas | Model of the Year; Style Influencer of the Year (Africa); Emerging Designer of the Year; Most Stylish Movie Star of the Year; African Designer of the Year; Makeup Artist of the Year; Best Dressed Celebrity on the Red Carpet; Fashion Blog of the Year (Africa); Most Stylish Music Artiste of the Year; Fashion Photographer of the Year; Most Stylish Media Personality of the Year; Red Carpet Designer of the Year; Most Stylish Business Executive | Roselyn Ashkar; Toke Makinwa; Quophi Akotuah; Zynell Zuh; Mai Atafo; Valerie Lawson; Nana Akua Addo; BellaNaija Style; Okyeame Kwame; Lightville; Berla Mundi; Sima Brew; Nathaniel Kwabena Adisi (Bola Ray) |
| 4 | 2018 | Mövenpick Ambassador Hotel | Elikem Kumordzie and Idia Aisien | Best dressed celebrity on the red carpet; Media Personality of the year; Social Media Style Influencer of the year; Model of the year; Emerging designer of the year; Fashion photographer of the year; Menswear designer of the year; Womenswear designer of the year; Makeup artist of the year; Style influencer of the year (Africa); Movie personality of the year; Stylist of the year; Artiste of the year; Red carpet designer of the year; African designer of the year; Fashion blogger of the year; Accessory Designer of the Year; Rising Style Influencer | Joselyn Dumas; Nathaniel Attoh; Nana Ama McBrown; Victoria Michaels; Yartel; Gilbert Asante; Atto Tetteh; Ophelia Okyere Darko (Ophelia Crossland); Valerie Lawson; Bonang Matheba; Zynnell Zuh; Kelvin Vincent; Becca; Sima Brew; Aisha Ayensu (Christie Brown); Ernest Donkor (Stylernest); Velma Owusu Bempah (Velma's Accessories); Lharley Lhartey |
| 5 | 2019 | Mövenpick Ambassador Hotel | Mia Atafo and Nikki Samoas | Best Dressed Celebrity on the Red Carpet; Artiste of the Year; Movie Personality of the Year; Model of the Year; Red Carpet Designer of the Year; Stylist of the Year; Style Influencer of the Year (Africa); African Designer of the Year; Emerging Designer of the Year; Social Media Style Influencer of the Year; Fashion Blogger of the Year; Fashion Photographer of the Year; Indigenous Beauty Brand of the Year; Designer of the Year; Makeup Artiste of the Year; Individual Style of the Year | Zynnell Lydia Zuh; King Promise; Mawuli Gavor; David Lartey (Nii Pro).; Quophi Akotuah; Kelvin Vincent; Juliet Olanipekun (Love from Julez); Aisha Ayensu; Lauren Ama Bartels (Lauren Haute Couture); King Promise; Debbie Beeko (Debbie Bjuku); Ben Bond Obiri Asamoah (OAB Photography); RnR Luxury; Ezekiel Yartel (Yartel Gh); Lawrencia Owusu (Lawrebabe); M.anifest |
| 5 | 2020 | | | | |
| 6 | 2021 | | | | |
