= Korle Gonno =

Coordinates: 5°32′N 0°13′W

- Interactive map of Korle Gonno
- Country: Ghana
- Region: Greater Accra

Population
  - Total: 27,826

== Background ==
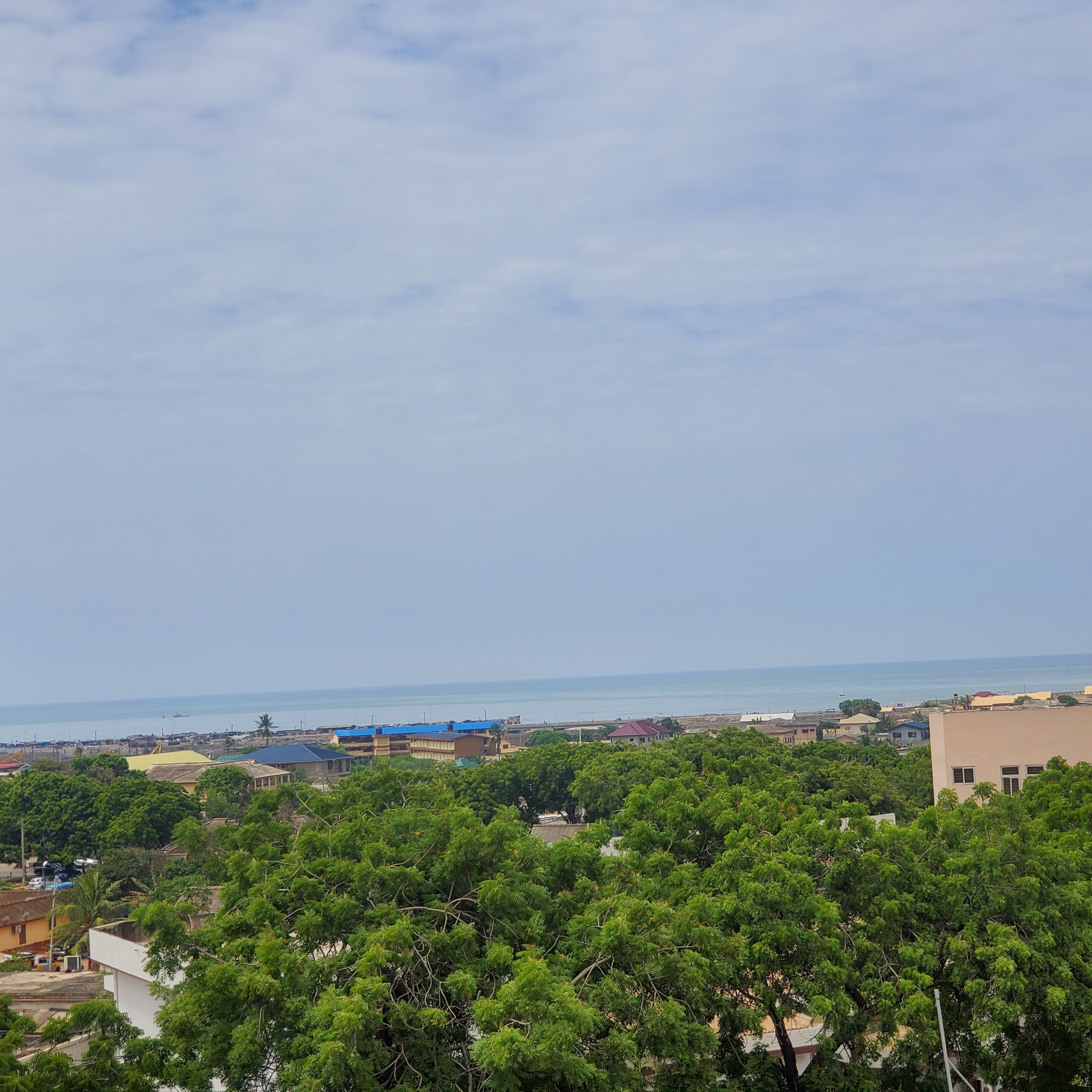
Accra, Korle Gonno Coastal line

Korle Gonno is a town in the Greater Accra Region of Ghana. Korle Gonno was established in the 1900s by the King of James Town, it was a small but vibrant community located strategically in proximity to key economic nodes in the city, e.g., Korle Bu Teaching Hospital a prominent health care facility in Gahna, the bustling indigenous "Tuesday Market" and the Central Business District. Korle Gonno was also known to be a centre for recreational activities due to its proximity to korle Lagoon and coastline.

The town is known for the Saint Mary's Secondary. The school is a second cycle institution. The Korle-Bu Teaching Hospital is located in Korle Gonno.
