= 2013 Commonwealth Heads of Government Meeting =

23rd Commonwealth Heads of Government Meeting CHOGM 2013
- Host country: Sri Lanka
- Dates: 15–17 November 2013
- Cities: Colombo
- Venues: Nelum Pokuna Mahinda Rajapaksa Theatre, Bandaranaike Memorial International Conference Hall, Waters Edge
- Participants: 50
- Heads of Government/State: 27
- Chair: Mahinda Rajapaksa
- Follows: 2011
- Precedes: 2015

Key points
- Colombo Declaration on Sustainable, Inclusive and Equitable Development; Trackle High Debt & Poverty; Boycott over Human rights in Sri Lanka

The 2013 Commonwealth Heads of Government Meeting (CHOGM; /ˈtʃɒɡəm/) was the 23rd meeting of the heads of government of the Commonwealth of Nations. It was held in Colombo, Sri Lanka, from 15 to 17 November 2013.

Commonwealth leaders agreed on Sri Lanka as the 2013 host for the meeting when they met in Port of Spain, Trinidad and Tobago, in 2009. Sri Lanka, which was originally slated to host the summit in 2011, was accused of committing atrocities during the Sri Lankan civil war and the summit was instead held in Perth, Australia; Colombo was given the 2013 summit instead. The leaders of Canada, Mauritius, and India boycotted the summit, citing alleged human rights violations by Sri Lanka against its Tamil minority. Protests were also banned during the summit. President Mahinda Rajapaksa summarised the summit's events as: "Issues covered in the communique include development, political values, global threats, challenges and Commonwealth cooperation." However, the meeting was overshadowed by controversy over Sri Lanka's human rights record and the alleged war crimes during the final stages of the civil war. This was the first time in 40 years that the Head of the Commonwealth, Queen Elizabeth II, was not present at the CHOGM.

== Background ==
At the Commonwealth Heads of Government Meeting 2007 in Kampala, Uganda, Commonwealth leaders agreed on Sri Lanka as the host for the 2011 meeting. However, during the final stages of the Sri Lankan civil war the government was accused of committing war crimes, and hence at the Commonwealth Heads of Government Meeting 2009 in Port of Spain, Trinidad and Tobago it was decided that the 2011 meeting would be held in Perth, Australia whilst Sri Lanka would host the 2013 meeting. At the 2011 meeting Commonwealth leaders reaffirmed that the 2013 meeting would be held in Sri Lanka.

In May 2013, Buckingham Palace announced that Queen Elizabeth II would not be attending the meeting. Charles, Prince of Wales, would be attending in the 87-year-old monarch's place, as she has curtailed her overseas visits due to age.

== Organisation ==
SriLankan Airlines bore the logo of the summit.

=== Venues ===
Amongst the venues, an unnamed branch of the Sri Lankan government, said that the main summit venue, in the capital, Colombo - Bandaranaike Memorial International Conference Hall - is an "outright gift from the Government and People of the People's Republic of China." The opening ceremony was held at Colombo's Nelum Pokuna Mahinda Rajapaksa Theatre. The leaders' retreat was at Waters Edge in the Sri Jayawardenapura Kotte suburb of the capital. Other venues included the International Convention Centre, Hambantota; Chaya Tranz, Hikkaduwa; and the Cinnamon Lakeside Hotel, Colombo.

== Summit ==
=== Official programme and agenda ===
The official programme outlined a week of activities including three days of meetings for heads of government.

=== Discussions ===
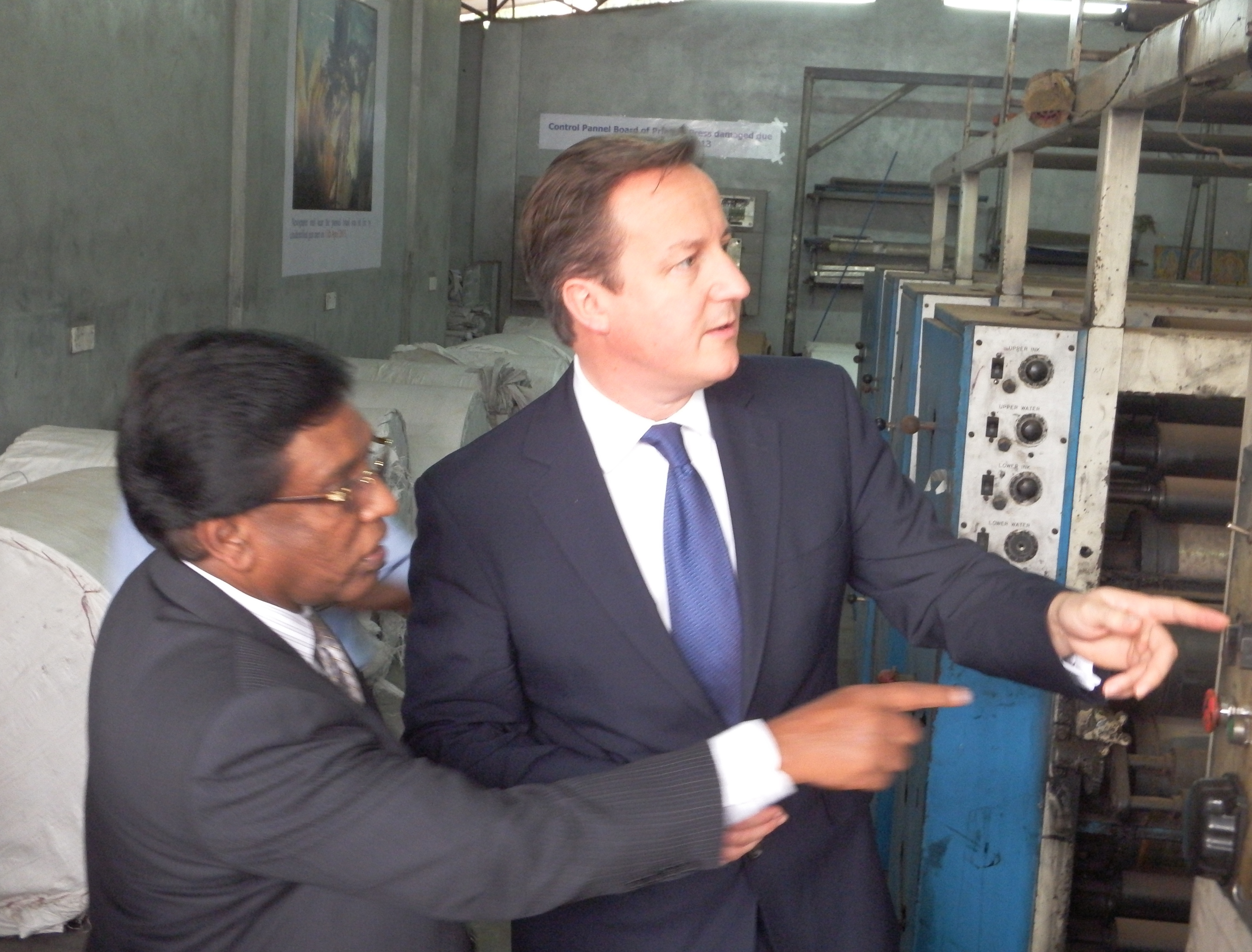
British Prime Minister David Cameron inspecting the burnt down printing press of Uthayan in Jaffna on 15 November with E. Saravanapavan, the managing director of the newspaper and a Member of Parliament representing Jaffna.

British Prime Minister David Cameron reiterated calls for an independent investigation into the alleged war crimes. "There needs to be proper inquiries into what happened at the end of the war, there needs to be proper human rights, democracy for the Tamil minority in that country" Cameron stated. He stated that if this investigation wasn't completed by March 2014 he would press for an independent international inquiry. This followed a visit to Jaffna Peninsula, the first visit to northern Sri Lanka by a foreign leader. Cameron was mobbed by demonstrators, mostly women, seeking his assistance in tracing missing relatives. Cameron also said that he would have "tough conversations" with Rajapaksa. In response to Cameron's pledge to push for a UN-led investigation into the alleged war crimes unless Sri Lanka credibly addressed human rights concerns by March 2014, Economic Development Minister Basil Rajapakse said: "Why should we have an international inquiry? We will object to it ... Definitely, we are not going to allow it." The Defence Secretary and another sibling of the President, Gotabhaya Rajapakse in a response, stated that "there were other countries such as Russia, China and Cuba at the UNHRC who would not support it." The defence minister also went on record to proclaim that the British Premier was 'siding' with the 'LTTE rump', and was mistakenly thinking that Sri Lanka was still a British colony.

In response to questions about the Government's use of torture, Prime Minister Tony Abbott told reporters that while his government "deplores the use of torture we accept that sometimes in difficult circumstances difficult things happen".

The chair of the Commonwealth Ministerial Action Group briefed heads of government on the electoral crisis in the Maldives. The CMAG had, earlier in November, expressed its "deep disappointment" that the presidential election process had not concluded prior to the expiration of the president's term in office on 11 November 2013. The CHOGM was expected to discuss how to deal with the situation on 16 November.

Canada and Australia blocked a proposal to establish a climate change fund, the Commonwealth Climate Change Risk Fund, named the Capital Green Fund, which would have assisted poorer countries dealing with the impact of global warming. The hereditary issue of leading the Commonwealth, however, did not appear to have been discussed formally and was not mentioned in the meeting's final communique.

In a speech given at a dinner held in honour of the government leaders, Prince Charles spoke in what The Daily Telegraph described as "a pitch for himself as the Queen's eventual successor as head of the organisation." He spoke of his personal attachment to the Commonwealth: "I feel very much part of the family. It's in my blood, I'm afraid. I have been brought up in the family and I think that what we are renewing here are those family ties, those family associations and family values. I feel proud and enormously privileged to be part of it all."

==== Outcomes ====
Malta was chosen as the host of CHOGM 2015. CHOGM 2018 will be held in Vanuatu and CHOGM 2020 will be held in Malaysia.

The final communique was issued as the Colombo Declaration on Sustainable, Inclusive and Equitable Development and agreed that eradicating poverty and climate change are major challenges for all countries. Other agreements were made on the necessity for steps to tackle high debt and poverty. Sri Lankan President Mahinda Rajapaksa said the meetings were characterised by "fruitful discussions...I am happy with the outcome we have reached at this CHOGM." However, he also warned against an ultimatum to address war crimes allegation by March 2014 saying he would not be pushed "into a corner." Other discussions included the "core values" of democracy, rule of law, human rights, freedom of expression and religion, women's rights, ridding corruption, transparency, natural resource management and taxation. It also mentioned the issues of small states, including Small Island Developing States; other global issues such as non-state terrorism, the Arms Trade Treaty and arms control, sexual violence in conflict, education, health and general social development. Specifically, the issues of Fiji, Cyprus, Belize, Guyana and The Gambia were discussed. Wider issues of building partnership and networks within the Commonwealth were also discussed.

== Controversy ==
=== Boycott ===
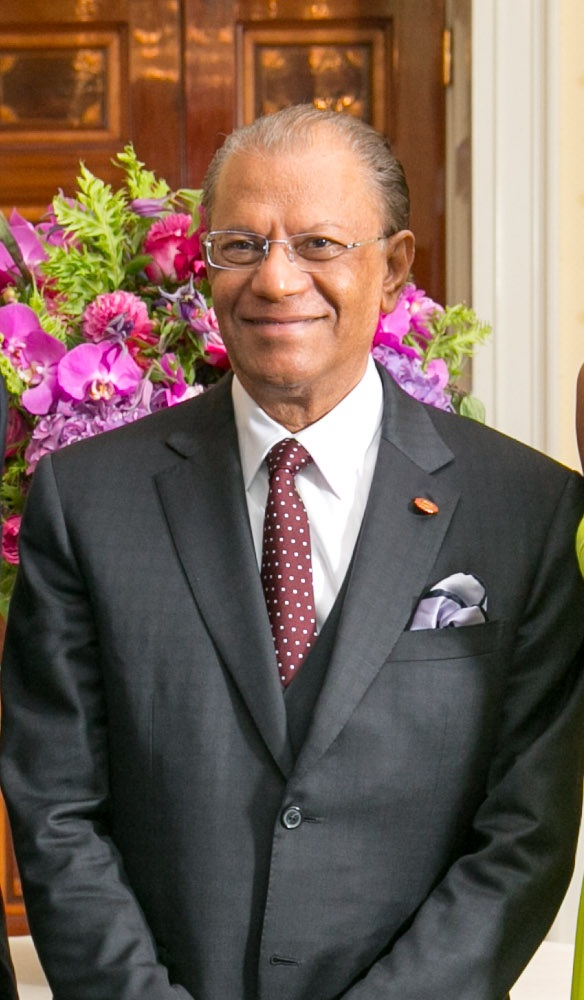
Mauritian Prime Minister Navin Ramgoolam was the third leader to boycott the summit over Sri Lanka's poor human rights record, and as a result, relinquished his country's bid to host the next summit in 2015.

There were significant calls from many bodies not to host the summit in Sri Lanka and to boycott the event, because of the country's alleged poor human rights record and reported atrocities against the Tamil population in the country.

Prime Minister of Canada Stephen Harper stated that he would not attend the meeting as a protest at Sri Lanka's alleged failure to improve its human rights record, as he said he would at the previous CHOGM; the Canadian Prime Minister had previously walked out of the 2011 summit during its last day when Sri Lankan President Mahinda Rajapaksa was invited to speak. It was announced that Parliamentary Secretary for the Minister of Foreign Affairs Deepak Obhrai would represent Canada. Harper further elaborated that Canada might cease its contributions to the funding of the Commonwealth should no action be taken by the organisation against Sri Lanka; he cited the impeachment of the country's chief justice and the execution and imprisonment of journalists and political opponents of President Mahinda Rajapaksa. At the time, Senator Hugh Segal, Canada's envoy to the Commonwealth, claimed that the Commonwealth Secretariat was acting "as a 'shill'" for Sri Lanka's government.

In October 2013, the Legislative Assembly of Tamil Nadu passed a unanimous resolution demanding that the Indian government boycott the meeting and also sought the temporary suspension of Sri Lanka from the Commonwealth until Sri Lanka takes steps to grant what they call similar rights to Tamils as those enjoyed by Sinhalese. Indian Prime Minister Manmohan Singh announced his decision not to participate in the event due to pressure from the regional Tamil party regarding Sri Lanka's alleged human rights record. External Affairs Minister Salman Khurshid, who represented India at the summit in the prime minister's place, said: "The position we have taken is, it is not a boycott."

The Prime Minister of Mauritius, Navin Ramgoolam, stated that he would not attend the meeting as a protest at Sri Lanka's alleged failure to improve its human rights record and was thus withdrawing as the host of CHOGM 2015 as protocol would have required him to attend the summit in order to personally invite other member states. "I have made it perfectly clear that human rights are more important than hosting a Commonwealth summit, regardless of its importance."

In the United Kingdom, the Foreign Affairs Select Committee called on that country's prime minister, David Cameron, not to attend the meeting in light of Sri Lanka's human rights record. Cameron also expressed concern about human rights issues in the country. However, Cameron later affirmed that he would attend. The Channel 4 documentary No Fire Zone, which presented evidence of alleged war crimes by the Sri Lanka Armed Forces, had resulted in increased calls for a boycott.

In Malaysia, Lim Guan Eng, Chief Minister of the state of Penang, and the Secretary General of the Democratic Action Party called on the Malaysian government to boycott the summit as a protest against alleged human violations committed by the island republic against ethnic Tamils there. However, the Malaysian Prime Minister Najib Razak rejected that and came to Colombo.

The New Zealand Green Party also placed similar calls for a boycott and for the replacement of Mahinda Rajapaksa as the Commonwealth Chairperson-in-office for the next two years. However New Zealand Prime minister attended the meeting.

Similar views were floated by South African anti-Apartheid campaigner and Nobel laureate archbishop Desmond Tutu who suggested that the boycott of the CHOGM could be "one of the screws that the world has to apply to help the Tamil population." but South African President Jacob Zuma attended the meeting.

=== Restrictions on media ===
Prior to the start of the meeting the Sri Lankan government had given assurances that foreign media would be given free and full access.

A team from Channel 4 News, which had broadcast several video clips of Sri Lankan troops allegedly committing atrocities during the civil war, arrived at Bandaranaike International Airport on 11 November 2013 and were met by a group of pro-government demonstrators, despite a ban on demonstrations during CHOGM. The Channel 4 News claimed that they were followed by state intelligence operatives throughout their visit to Sri Lanka. On 13 November 2013 the Channel 4 News team tried to get to Kilinochchi in northern Sri Lanka by train but a group of pro-government demonstrators blocked the railway line near Anuradhapura. Channel 4 News claimed that they had been followed on to the train by state intelligence operatives. The team were forced into a van by police and driven back to Colombo. At 6.30am on 17 November 2013 six immigration officials visited the Channel 4 News crew at their hotel and warned them against violating the conditions laid down in their visas. Channel 4 News left Sri Lanka later on 17 November 2013, earlier than planned, blaming intimidation and surveillance by Sri Lankan security forces.

A BBC News crew trying to film President Rajapaksa at a CHOGM event on 14 November 2013 were physically restrained by security officials. An Agence France-Presse trying to work in Mullaitivu District on 18 November 2013 were prevented from doing so by the military.

=== Restrictions on protests ===
In October 2013 it was reported that the government was planning to ban all protests, marches and other demonstrations for three weeks in November, coinciding with CHOGM. The government denied the reports. However, on 14 November 2013 the police obtained a court order preventing any protests during CHOGM.

A group of Tamils trying to travel to Colombo on 13 November 2013 to protest about disappeared relatives were prevented from doing so by the Sri Lankan military.

=== Restrictions on travel ===
The Civil Air Services Authority suspended all FitsAir flights to Jaffna Airport between 10 and 18 November 2013, allegedly to restrict foreign access to the north of the country.

== Participants ==
Of the 53 Commonwealth members, only 27 heads of government/state (nine presidents, 16 prime ministers, one sultan and one governor general) attended the meeting, the lowest in decades. 22 other members sent other delegates such as foreign ministers, vice-presidents, deputy prime ministers and high commissioners. Three members - Grenada, Kiribati and Maldives - did not attend and Fiji was suspended from the Commonwealth. The participants were:

Country	Representative	Office
Commonwealth	Prince Charles	Prince of Wales (representing the Head of the Commonwealth)
Commonwealth	Kamalesh Sharma	Commonwealth Secretary-General
Sri Lanka	Mahinda Rajapaksa (Chair-in-office)	President
Antigua and Barbuda	Carl Bertrand Westerby Roberts	High Commissioner to the United Kingdom
Australia	Tony Abbott	Prime Minister
Bangladesh	Sheikh Hasina	Prime Minister
Bahamas	Perry Christie	Prime Minister
Barbados	Maxine McClean	Minister of Foreign Affairs and Foreign Trade
Belize	Wilfred Peter Elrington	Minister of Foreign Affairs and Foreign Trade
Botswana	Kenneth Matambo	Minister of Finance
Brunei	Hassanal Bolkiah	Sultan
Cameroon	Joseph Ngute	Minister Delegate to the Minister of Foreign Affairs
Canada	Deepak Obhrai	Parliamentary Secretary to the Minister of Foreign Affairs
Cyprus	Nicos Anastasiades	President
Dominica	Francine Barron	High Commissioner to the United Kingdom
Ghana	Kwesi Amissah-Arthur	Vice President
Guyana	Donald Ramotar	President
India	Salman Khurshid	Minister of External Affairs
Jamaica	Arnold Nicholson	Minister of Foreign Affairs and Foreign Trade
Kenya	Amina Mohamed	Cabinet Secretary for Foreign Affairs
Lesotho	Tom Thabane	Prime Minister
Malawi	Khumbo Kachali	Vice President
Malaysia	Najib Razak	Prime Minister
Malta	Joseph Muscat	Prime Minister
Mauritius	Arvin Boolell	Minister of Foreign Affairs
Mozambique	Oldemiro Balói	Minister of Foreign Affairs
Namibia	Hifikepunye Pohamba	President
Nauru	Baron Waqa	President
New Zealand	John Key	Prime Minister
Nigeria	Namadi Sambo	Vice President
Pakistan	Nawaz Sharif	Prime Minister
Papua New Guinea	Leo Dion	Deputy Prime Minister
Rwanda	Paul Kagame	President
Saint Kitts and Nevis	Denzil Douglas	Prime Minister
Saint Lucia	Alva Baptiste	Minister of Foreign Affairs
Saint Vincent and the Grenadines	Cenio E. Lewis	High Commissioner to the United Kingdom
Samoa	Tuilaepa Aiono Sailele Malielegaoi	Prime Minister
Seychelles	James Michel	President
Sierra Leone	Samura Kamara	Minister of Foreign Affairs and International Cooperation
Singapore	Lee Hsien Loong	Prime Minister
Solomon Islands	Gordon Darcy Lilo	Prime Minister
South Africa	Jacob Zuma	President
Swaziland	Barnabas Sibusiso Dlamini	Prime Minister
Tanzania	Jakaya Kikwete	President
Tonga	Sialeʻataongo Tuʻivakanō	Prime Minister
Trinidad and Tobago	Winston Dookeran	Minister of Foreign Affairs
Tuvalu	Iakoba Italeli	Governor General
Uganda	Edward Ssekandi	Vice President
United Kingdom	David Cameron	Prime Minister
Vanuatu	Moana Carcasses Kalosil	Prime Minister
Zambia	Guy Scott	Vice President
