= Commonwealth Chair-in-Office =

Leadership position in the Commonwealth of Nations

Chair-in-Office of the Commonwealth of Nations
- Incumbent; Gaston Browne since 1 November 2026
- Term length: 2 years
- Inaugural holder: Thabo Mbeki
- Formation: 12 November 1999
- Website: Chair-in-Office

The Commonwealth Chair-in-Office (CIO) is the Chair-in-Office of the Commonwealth of Nations, and is one of the main leadership positions in the Commonwealth. It is held by the host chairperson of the previous Commonwealth Heads of Government Meeting (CHOGM), and is maintained until the next CHOGM. Gaston Browne, Prime Minister of Antigua and Barbuda, is the current Chair-in-Office of the association since 1 November 2026.

== Overview ==
The primary responsibility of the Chair-in-Office is to host the CHOGM, but their roles can be expanded. For example, after the 2002 CHOGM, the incumbent, previous, and next Chairmen-in-Office formed a troika in an attempt to resolve the ongoing dispute over Zimbabwe's membership of the Commonwealth.

The position was created after the 1999 CHOGM, with Thabo Mbeki becoming the first Chair-in-Office. However, Mbeki did very little to develop the position, leaving it virtually vacant until the next CHOGM in 2002, when the troika was created. Even after John Howard became Chair, the troika's first meeting was in London, in the presence of the Commonwealth Secretary-General. The third Chair, Olusegun Obasanjo, did more to invigorate the role of the position after taking over in 2003.

From the assumption of the role at the 2009 CHOGM, representatives from Trinidad and Tobago, including the Prime Ministers, attended Commonwealth meetings, including 2011 Commonwealth Day celebrations where Kamla Persad-Bissessar, the first woman to chair the Commonwealth, gave the keynote address. Sri Lanka was due to host the Commonwealth Economic Forum in 2011 but it was held instead in Perth, Western Australia, due to accusations of war crimes committed during the Sri Lankan Civil War.

As Prime Minister of Australia, Julia Gillard succeeded Persad-Bissessar as the second female Chair at the 2011 CHOGM. Julia Gillard was in-turn succeeded by Kevin Rudd after she resigned as Prime Minister of Australia on 27 June 2013. Rudd went on to lose the Australian federal election in September 2013, and consequently was succeeded as Commonwealth's CiO by the new prime minister Tony Abbott. Abbott remained in the position until Commonwealth leaders met for the 23rd time on 15 November 2013, where he was succeeded by the President of Sri Lanka Mahinda Rajapaksa, who was succeeded by Maithripala Sirisena in 2015.

== List of chairs-in-office ==
No.	Image	Name	Country	Title	CHOGM	Start	End	Secretary-General
1		Thabo Mbeki	South Africa	President	1999	12 November 1999	2 March 2002	(Nigeria) Emeka Anyaoku
1		Thabo Mbeki	South Africa	President	1999	12 November 1999	2 March 2002	(New Zealand) Don McKinnon
2		John Howard	Australia	Prime Minister	2002	2 March 2002	5 December 2003	(New Zealand) Don McKinnon
3		Olusegun Obasanjo	Nigeria	President	2003	5 December 2003	25 November 2005	(New Zealand) Don McKinnon
4		Lawrence Gonzi	Malta	Prime Minister	2005	25 November 2005	23 November 2007	(New Zealand) Don McKinnon
5		Yoweri Museveni	Uganda	President	2007	23 November 2007	27 November 2009	(New Zealand) Don McKinnon
5		Yoweri Museveni	Uganda	President	2007	23 November 2007	27 November 2009	(India) Kamalesh Sharma
6		Patrick Manning	Trinidad and Tobago	Prime Minister	2009	27 November 2009	25 May 2010	(India) Kamalesh Sharma
7		Kamla Persad-Bissessar	Trinidad and Tobago	Prime Minister	2009	26 May 2010	28 October 2011	(India) Kamalesh Sharma
8		Julia Gillard	Australia	Prime Minister	2011	28 October 2011	27 June 2013	(India) Kamalesh Sharma
9		Kevin Rudd	Australia	Prime Minister	2011	27 June 2013	18 September 2013	(India) Kamalesh Sharma
10		Tony Abbott	Australia	Prime Minister	2011	18 September 2013	15 November 2013	(India) Kamalesh Sharma
11		Mahinda Rajapaksa	Sri Lanka	President	2013	15 November 2013	9 January 2015	(India) Kamalesh Sharma
12		Maithripala Sirisena	Sri Lanka	President	2013	9 January 2015	27 November 2015	(India) Kamalesh Sharma
13		Joseph Muscat	Malta	Prime Minister	2015	27 November 2015	19 April 2018	(India) Kamalesh Sharma
13		Joseph Muscat	Malta	Prime Minister	2015	27 November 2015	19 April 2018	(United Kingdom) (Dominica) Patricia Scotland
14		Theresa May	United Kingdom	Prime Minister	2018	19 April 2018	24 July 2019	(United Kingdom) (Dominica) Patricia Scotland
15		Boris Johnson	United Kingdom	Prime Minister	2018	24 July 2019	24 June 2022	(United Kingdom) (Dominica) Patricia Scotland
16		Paul Kagame	Rwanda	President	2022	24 June 2022	25 October 2024	(United Kingdom) (Dominica) Patricia Scotland
17		Fiamē Naomi Mataʻafa	Samoa	Prime Minister	2024	25 October 2024	16 September 2025	(United Kingdom) (Dominica) Patricia Scotland
18		Laʻauli Leuatea Schmidt	Samoa	Prime Minister	2024	16 September 2025	1 November 2026	(United Kingdom) (Dominica) Patricia Scotland
18		Laʻauli Leuatea Schmidt	Samoa	Prime Minister	2024	16 September 2025	1 November 2026	(Ghana) Shirley Ayorkor Botchwey
19		Gaston Browne	Antigua and Barbuda	Prime Minister	2026	1 November 2026	Incumbent	(Ghana) Shirley Ayorkor Botchwey
