= 2022 Commonwealth Heads of Government Meeting =

International summit in Kigali, Rwanda

26th Commonwealth Heads of Government Meeting CHOGM 2022
- Host country: Rwanda
- Dates: 24–25 June 2022
- Cities: Kigali
- Venues: Kigali Convention Centre
- Chair: Paul Kagame, President of Rwanda
- Follows: 2018
- Precedes: 2024
- Website: www.chogm2022.rw

Key points
- Election of Secretary-General, post-COVID-19 recovery, health, Ukraine

The 2022 Commonwealth Heads of Government Meeting (Kinyarwanda: 2022 Abayobozi ba Commonwealth Inama ya Guverinoma; French: Réunion des chefs de gouvernement du Commonwealth 2022; Swahili: Mkutano wa Wakuu wa Serikali wa Jumuiya ya Madola wa 2022), also known as CHOGM 2022, was the 26th Meeting of the Heads of Government of the Commonwealth of Nations. The meeting was originally scheduled for 26–27 June 2020 in Kigali, Rwanda preceded by various fora between 22 and 25 June, but was postponed twice due to the COVID-19 pandemic. On 31 January 2022, it was announced that the meeting would be held on 24 and 25 June 2022 and the pre-meeting fora held from 20 to 23 June.

Charles, Prince of Wales, represented the Head of the Commonwealth, Queen Elizabeth II, at the summit. The Queen died less than three months later, on 8 September 2022.

== Background ==
The Commonwealth Heads of Government Meeting (CHOGM) is a pivotal agenda-setting and decision-making space for the diverse community of 56 Commonwealth countries. The 2022 CHOGM was scheduled to be held in Rwanda. It was the first Commonwealth Summit held in a country that is not a former British colony or dominion or the United Kingdom itself. Rwanda was previously a colony of Belgium, gaining independence on 1 July 1962 and plunged into a massacre of Tutsis in 1994. Perpetrated by Théoneste Bagosora's Hutu militiamen, the incident causing Rwanda's human rights stance and democracy freedom were questioned. It was also a member of Organisation internationale de la Francophonie/International Organisation of La Francophonie (OIF). Having been surrounded by Commonwealth states (Tanzania and Uganda), it joined the association in 2009.

On 8 May 2021, the CHOGM was postponed by President Paul Kagame of Rwanda and Commonwealth secretary-general Patricia Scotland a second time due to the COVID-19 pandemic.

On 31 January 2022, Kagame and Scotland announced that the CHOGM will be held in the week of 20 June 2022, following agreement by all member countries of the Commonwealth.

== Attendees ==
Of the 53 Commonwealth member countries, 50 countries sent an official representative while 3 countries - Grenada, Kiribati and Nauru did not send any official representative or delegation. 14 countries were represented by their respective heads of state including the reigning monarchs from Brunei and Eswatini, 18 countries by their respective heads of government, 4 countries by their respective deputy heads of state or deputy heads of government, 10 countries by ministerial representatives while 4 countries sent their respective diplomats or special envoys. The Commonwealth was represented by the Prince of Wales on behalf of Queen Elizabeth II, the Head of the Commonwealth and by Patricia Scotland, the Secretary-General of the Commonwealth.

Maldives, represented by its president Ibrahim Mohamed Solih attended its first summit since re-joining the Commonwealth in 2018.

Country	Representative	Position
Commonwealth	Prince Charles	Prince of Wales (representing the Head of the Commonwealth)
Commonwealth	Patricia Scotland	Commonwealth Secretary-General
Antigua and Barbuda	Gaston Browne	Prime Minister
Australia	Richard Marles	Deputy Prime Minister
Bahamas	Philip Davis	Prime Minister
Bangladesh	AK Abdul Momen	Minister of Foreign Affairs
Barbados	Kerrie Symmonds	Minister of Foreign Affairs and Foreign Trade
Belize	Johnny Briceño	Prime Minister
Botswana	Mokgweetsi Masisi	President
Brunei	Hassanal Bolkiah	Sultan
Cameroon	Joseph Ngute	Prime Minister
Canada	Justin Trudeau	Prime Minister
Cyprus	Ioannis Kasoulides	Minister of Foreign Affairs
Dominica	Roosevelt Skerrit	Prime Minister
Eswatini	Mswati III	King
Fiji	Jitoko Tikolevu	High Commissioner to the United Kingdom
Gambia	Badara Joof	Vice President
Ghana	Nana Akufo-Addo	President
Guyana	Mohamed Irfaan Ali	President
India	S. Jaishankar	Minister of External Affairs
Jamaica	Andrew Holness	Prime Minister
Kenya	Uhuru Kenyatta	President
Lesotho	Moeketsi Majoro	Prime Minister
Malawi	Nancy Tembo	Minister of Foreign Affairs
Malaysia	Saifuddin Abdullah	Minister of Foreign Affairs
Maldives	Ibrahim Mohamed Solih	President
Malta	Chris Fearne	Deputy Prime Minister
Mauritius	Pravind Jugnauth	Prime Minister
Mozambique	Adriano Maleiane	Prime Minister
Namibia	Hage Geingob	President
New Zealand	Nanaia Mahuta	Minister of Foreign Affairs
Nigeria	Muhammadu Buhari	President
Pakistan	Hina Rabbani Khar	Minister of State for Foreign Affairs
Papua New Guinea	Winnie Kiap	High Commissioner to the United Kingdom
Rwanda	Paul Kagame (Chair)	President of Rwanda
Saint Lucia	Philip J. Pierre	Prime Minister
Saint Vincent and the Grenadines	Camillo Gonsalves	Minister of Finance, Economic Planning and Information Technology
Samoa	Fiamē Naomi Mataʻafa	Prime Minister
Seychelles	Wavel Ramkalawan	President
Sierra Leone	Julius Maada Bio	President
Singapore	Lee Hsien Loong	Prime Minister
Slovenia	Colin Beck	Permanent Secretary for Foreign Affairs and External Trade
South Africa	Naledi Pandor	Minister of International Relations and Cooperation
Sri Lanka	G. L. Peiris	Minister of Foreign Affairs
Tanzania	Philip Mpango	Vice President
Tonga	Siaosi Sovaleni	Prime Minister
Trinidad and Tobago	Amery Browne	Minister of Foreign and CARICOM Affairs
Tuvalu	Simon Kofe	Minister of Justice, Communications and Foreign Affairs
Uganda	Yoweri Museveni	President
United Kingdom	Boris Johnson	Prime Minister
Vanuatu	Georges Maniuri	High Commissioner to the United Kingdom
Zambia	Hakainde Hichilema	President

== Agenda ==
In his speech at the opening ceremony, Charles, Prince of Wales said that the decision for Commonwealth realms as to whether to remain a monarchy, or become a republic, were purely a matter for each member country to decide, and suggested that changes can be made "calmly and without rancour".

The position of Commonwealth Chair-in-Office, held by the government leader of the CHOGM host country, was transferred at the summit from the prime minister of the United Kingdom to the president of Rwanda, who will hold the post until the 27th CHOGM to be held in Samoa and which was initially scheduled for 2022.

The theme for the meeting was 'Delivering A Common Future: Connecting, Innovating, Transforming'. Five sub-themes have been identified for discussion: Governance and Rule of Law, ICT & Innovation, Youth, Environment and Trade. Leaders discussed ways the contemporary Commonwealth can transform societies, in accordance with Commonwealth Charter values of democracy, multilateralism, sustainable development, and empowerment of women and youth.

Ahead of the meeting, ministers of parliament, youth and gender activists, and representatives from civil society and commerce convened special forums to ensure the consideration of key concerns and perspectives of women, young people, businesses and non-governmental organisations in leaders' decision-making.

=== Environment ===
Commonwealth leaders and senior officials expressed support for a non-binding charter on climate change, biodiversity and land degradation.

=== Small states ===
Ministers discussed ways of improving the resilience of small states, resulting in several Commonwealth nations being declared "Commonwealth Small States Advocacy Champions whose role is to galvanise support for the Advocacy Strategy" and the "Launch of the Commonwealth Virtual Centre for Small States (VCSS), a tailor-made platform which connects Commonwealth Small States Offices in New York, Geneva and the Commonwealth Secretariat."

=== Women's rights and safety ===
The Commonwealth Women's Forum discussed actions for promoting gender equality. The Commonwealth Secretariat and the NO MORE foundation launched new guidelines for combatting violence against women and girls within the Commonwealth.

=== Youth ===
Youth delegates presented a series of recommendations for Commonwealth heads of government, including increased taxes on industrial polluters and more support for youth-led start-up businesses.

== Secretary-General election ==
There was an attempt by the United Kingdom to deny Patricia Scotland a second term as Commonwealth Secretary-General. The British government rejected an attempt in 2020 to automatically appoint Scotland to a second term and has reportedly lost confidence in her due to allegations about her leadership style and spending while in office. Kenyan defence minister Monica Juma was nominated in August 2021 for the position of Secretary-General by Kenyan president Uhuru Kenyatta. She withdrew her candidacy in February 2021, saying she did not want her candidacy to further divide the Commonwealth.

In April 2022, Jamaica nominated its foreign minister, Kamina Johnson Smith, as a candidate for Secretary-General, prompting criticism from other Caribbean states that were backing Lady Scotland's re-election.

Tuvalu had proposed its former governor-general, Sir Iakoba Italeli, for the post of secretary general – the first time a Pacific nation has sought the role.

Lady Scotland was re-elected to a second term, reportedly defeating Johnson Smith by 27 votes to 24, with Italeli having withdrawn. As her first term had been extended by two years due to the pandemic and the postponement of the 2020 CHOGM, Scotland promised that she will only serve for two more years instead of a full four-year term.

== Human Rights in Rwanda ==
The Commonwealth Human Rights Initiative, Human Rights Watch, and Freedom House have all found that the protection of democracy and human rights in Rwanda have declined since the country joined the Commonwealth in 2009. There had been calls for the Commonwealth to stand up for democracy and human rights in Rwanda at the 2022 CHOGM.

Such calls have included for Commonwealth governments to pressure CHOGM 2022 host Rwanda to free human rights defender Paul Rusesabagina. The UN Working Group on Arbitrary Detention found on 18 March 2022 that he had been illegally kidnapped, tortured, and sentenced after an unfair trial. The Working Group stated that: "It is clear on the facts that Mr. Rusesabagina has been targeted by the Government on account of his work as a human rights defender, because of his criticism of the Government on a broad range of human rights issues, including unfair elections and a lack of democracy, freedom of speech, freedom of association and freedom of the press. He has also challenged cases of arbitrary detention, torture and extrajudicial killings." The Working Group called on the Government "to release Mr. Rusesabagina immediately and accord him an enforceable right to compensation and other reparations, in accordance with international law" and "to ensure a full and independent investigation of the circumstances surrounding the arbitrary deprivation of liberty of Mr. Rusesabagina and to take appropriate measures against those responsible for the violation of his rights."

Rusesabagina's family welcomed the Working Group's finding, and were "hopeful that the world will listen to this call by the United Nations and put pressure on Rwanda to immediately free our father and husband."

== Togo and Gabon ==
Togo and Gabon joined the Commonwealth, despite never having been under British rule.
