= 2018 Commonwealth Heads of Government Meeting =

25th meeting of heads of government, held in the UK

25th Commonwealth Heads of Government Meeting CHOGM 2018
- Host country: United Kingdom
- Dates: 19–20 April 2018
- Cities: London and Windsor
- Venues: Buckingham Palace, Lancaster House, and Windsor Castle (retreat)
- Chair: Theresa May, Prime Minister of the United Kingdom
- Follows: 2015
- Precedes: 2022
- Website: chogm2018.org.uk (archived)

Key points
- Head of the Commonwealth succession; Commonwealth Blue Charter on ocean conservation and plastic waste; trade and investment, Commonwealth Cyber Declaration

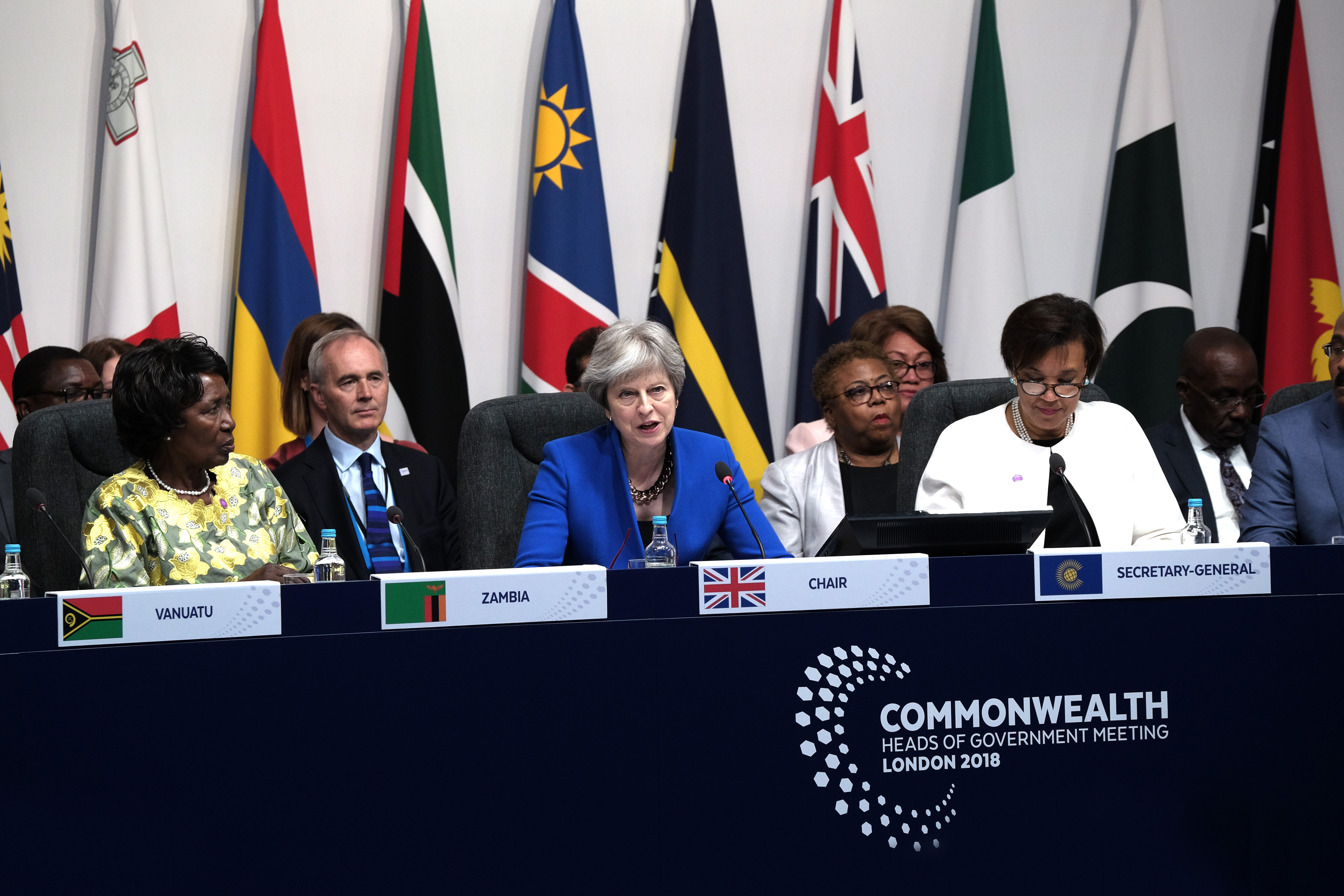
Theresa May speaks as chair of the meeting

The 2018 Commonwealth Heads of Government Meeting (also known as CHOGM 2018) was the 25th meeting of the heads of government of the Commonwealth of Nations, held on 19–20 April 2018 in the United Kingdom.

The meeting was planned to be held at the end of 2017 in Vanuatu, but was moved to the United Kingdom after the impact of Cyclone Pam on the infrastructure of Vanuatu. The meeting was then postponed to April 2018 due to other international commitments.

The position of Commonwealth Chair-in-Office, held by the government leader of the CHOGM host country, was transferred at the summit from the prime minister of Malta to the prime minister of the United Kingdom, who held the post until the 26th CHOGM in 2022.

== Agenda ==
The theme of the summit was "Towards a Common Future". The British hosts set out four main goals for the summit:

- prosperity: boosting intra-Commonwealth trade and investment
- security: increasing cooperation across security challenges including global terrorism, organised crime and cyber attacks
- fairness: promoting democracy, fundamental freedoms and good governance across the Commonwealth
- sustainability: building the resilience of small and vulnerable states to deal with the effects of climate change and other global crises

Under consideration were: A Commonwealth Blue Charter on ocean governance, a Commonwealth connectivity agenda for trade and investment, a declaration on cybercrime, and revised Commonwealth guidelines on election observation in member countries.

=== Trade ===
This was the first CHOGM held following the United Kingdom's decision to withdraw from the European Union, a decision which has resulted in calls for Britain to strengthen its economic ties with and play a greater role in the Commonwealth. The Commonwealth, as of 2018, was responsible for one-tenth of British trade compare to the EU with which the UK currently conducts half of its trade. Intra-Commonwealth trade, overall, is expected to increase by at least 17% to around US$700 billion by 2020.

The British government reportedly hoped to use the CHOGM to open negotiations for expanded trade with Commonwealth nations to replace lost trade with the EU, however, as the summit began The Economist dismissed the belief that the Commonwealth could fill the gap created by Brexit as "an amiable delusion".

=== Head of the Commonwealth and the Royal Family ===
The succession of the Headship of the Commonwealth, and the roles of other members of the Royal Family was discussed, and a proposal to nominate Queen Elizabeth II for the Nobel Peace Prize was also expected to feature in discussions.

At a speech welcoming Commonwealth leaders to Buckingham Palace on the first day of the summit, the Queen said "It is my sincere wish that the Commonwealth will continue to offer stability and continuity for future generations, and will decide that one day the Prince of Wales should carry on the important work started by my father in 1949."

On 20 April, the second day of the summit, the Commonwealth leaders agreed that Prince Charles would succeed the Queen as Head of the Commonwealth.

=== LGBTQ rights ===
The British government was accused by LGBTQ activists of backing away from plans to make LGBTQ rights in the Commonwealth of Nations an issue during the summit. Homosexuality remains a criminal offence in 37 out of 53 Commonwealth states. LGBTQ rights campaigners from the UK and across the Commonwealth picketed Marlborough House, the headquarters of the Commonwealth Secretariat, on 19 April in order to draw attention to the issue. UK Prime Minister Theresa May said in a speech to Commonwealth leaders that she "deeply regrets" Britain's role in having same-sex conduct criminalized in colonial laws that remain in force in many Commonwealth countries, saying of these laws that "They were wrong then and they are wrong now" and that the UK government supports the reform of these laws in former colonies.

=== Commonwealth Clean Oceans Alliance ===
The UK promised to spend £61m to combat the pollution of the world's oceans by plastics and announced that it would ban plastic straws, microbeads, and other waste and to help developing countries curb plastics and other environmental pollutants from contaminating the oceans, and urged other Commonwealth countries to do the same. Five countries have joined the Commonwealth Clean Oceans Alliance: the UK, New Zealand, Sri Lanka, Vanuatu and Ghana.

=== Commonwealth Cyber Declaration ===
The Commonwealth unanimously adopted the Commonwealth Cyber Declaration with leaders agreeing to work closely to strengthen their cybersecurity frameworks and response mechanisms by 2020.

== Participants ==
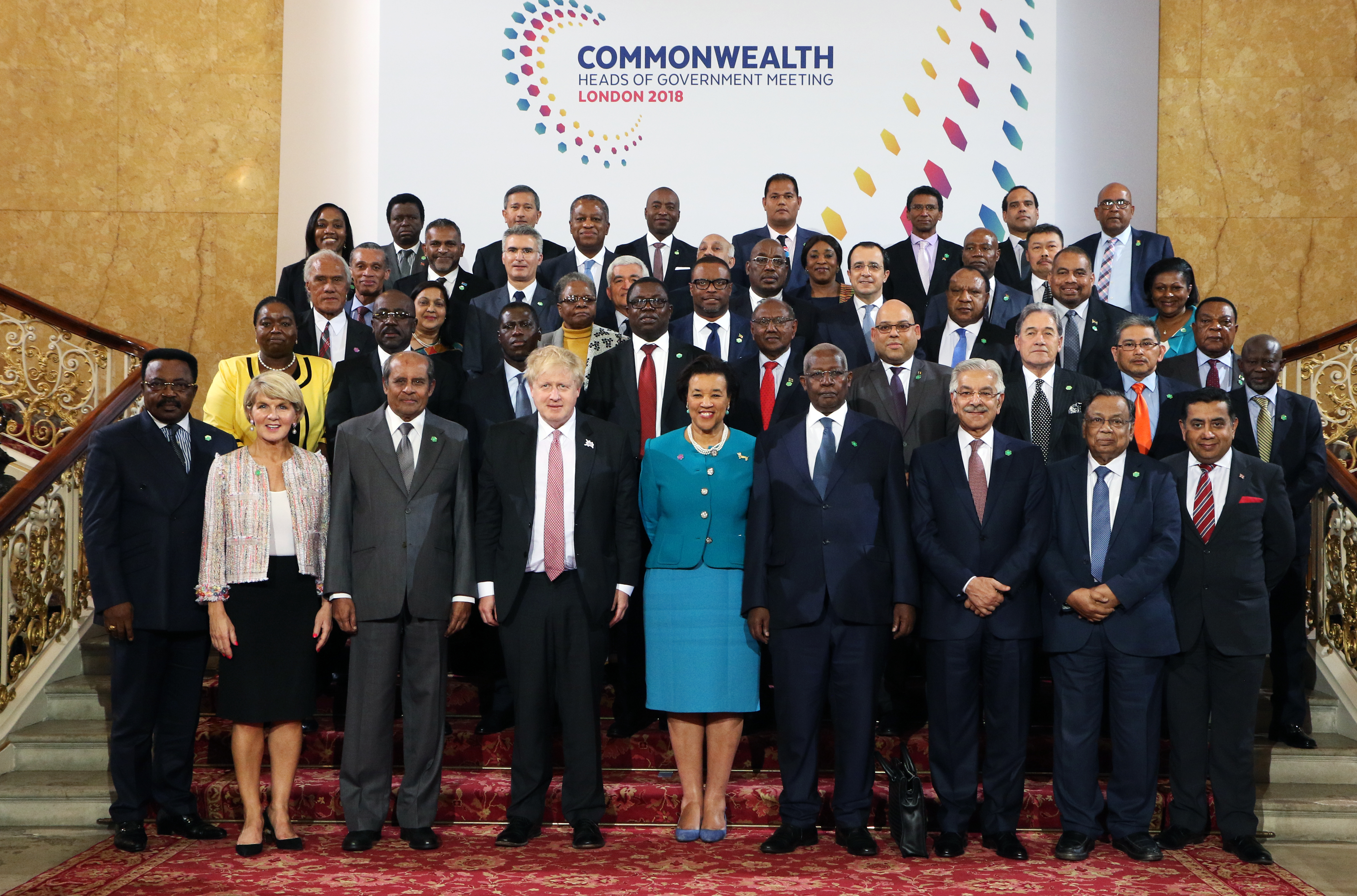
Foreign ministers present at CHOGM 2018

Of the 53 Commonwealth member countries, 19 were presented by the respective heads of state (1 Sultan and 18 Presidents), 28 countries by their respective heads of government including the host country, 2 by their respective deputy heads of state, 1 by their deputy head of government, 1 by the presiding officer of the national legislature, and remaining 2 by their foreign ministers.

The Commonwealth was represented by the presence of Queen Elizabeth II as Head of the Commonwealth and Charles, Prince of Wales while the Commonwealth Secretariat was represented by the Secretary-General Patricia Scotland.

Country	Representative	Office
Commonwealth	Elizabeth II, Queen	Head of the Commonwealth
Commonwealth	Patricia Scotland	Commonwealth Secretary-General
United Kingdom	Theresa May (Chair-in-Office)	Prime Minister
Antigua and Barbuda	Gaston Browne	Prime Minister
Australia	Malcolm Turnbull	Prime Minister
Bahamas	Hubert Minnis	Prime Minister
Bangladesh	Sheikh Hasina	Prime Minister
Barbados	Maxine McClean	Minister of Foreign Affairs and Foreign Trade
Belize	Wilfred Elrington	Minister of Foreign Affairs and Foreign Trade
Botswana	Mokgweetsi Masisi	President
Brunei	Hassanal Bolkiah	Sultan
Cameroon	Philémon Yang	Prime Minister
Canada	Justin Trudeau	Prime Minister
Cyprus	Nicos Anastasiades	President
Dominica	Roosevelt Skerrit	Prime Minister
Fiji	Frank Bainimarama	Prime Minister
Gambia	Adama Barrow	President
Ghana	Nana Akufo-Addo	President
Grenada	Keith Mitchell	Prime Minister
Guyana	David A. Granger	President
India	Narendra Modi	Prime Minister
Jamaica	Andrew Holness	Prime Minister
Kenya	Uhuru Kenyatta	President
Kiribati	Taneti Maamau	President
Lesotho	Tom Thabane	Prime Minister
Malawi	Peter Mutharika	President
Malaysia	Vigneswaran Sanasee	President of the Dewan Negara
Malta	Joseph Muscat	Prime Minister
Malaysia	Pravind Jugnauth	Prime Minister
Mozambique	Filipe Nyusi	President
Namibia	Hage Geingob	President
Nauru	Baron Waqa	President
New Zealand	Jacinda Ardern	Prime Minister
Nigeria	Muhammadu Buhari	President
Pakistan	Shahid Khaqan Abbasi	Prime Minister
Papua New Guinea	Peter O'Neill	Prime Minister
Rwanda	Paul Kagame	President
Saint Kitts and Nevis	Timothy Harris	Prime Minister
Saint Lucia	Allen Chastanet	Prime Minister
Saint Vincent and the Grenadines	Louis Straker	Deputy Prime Minister
Samoa	Tuilaʻepa Saʻilele Malielegaoi	Prime Minister
Seychelles	Danny Faure	President
Sierra Leone	Julius Maada Bio	President
Singapore	Lee Hsien Loong	Prime Minister
Solomon Islands	Rick Houenipwela	Prime Minister
South Africa	Cyril Ramaphosa	President
Sri Lanka	Maithripala Sirisena	President
Swaziland	Barnabas Sibusiso Dlamini	Prime Minister
Tanzania	Samia Suluhu	Vice President
Tonga	ʻAkilisi Pōhiva	Prime Minister
Trinidad and Tobago	Keith Rowley	Prime Minister
Tuvalu	Enele Sopoaga	Prime Minister
Uganda	Yoweri Museveni	President
Vanuatu	Charlot Salwai	Prime Minister
Zambia	Inonge Wina	Vice President

== Outcomes ==
The leaders issued a Communiqué at the close of the summit in which they:

- committed their countries to ratifying and implementing the Convention on the Elimination of All Forms of Discrimination Against Women,
- "mainstream youth priorities into national development policies and plans",
- "address the stigma around disability in all its forms and manifestations",
- agreed to Report of the Commonwealth Ministerial Action Group on the Commonwealth's fundamental political values,
- adopted the Revised Commonwealth Guidelines on Election Observation in Member Countries
- called for strengthening the international response to the large movement of refugees, including return to their country of origin in safety and dignity
- "adopted a Declaration on the Commonwealth Connectivity Agenda for Trade and Investment and mandated the Secretariat to develop an accompanying action plan that considers capacity building and hard and soft connectivity"
- adopted the Commonwealth Blue Charter on sustainable development and protection of the world's oceans
- adopted a Commonwealth Cyber Declaration that "reflects Commonwealth values, and sets out a common commitment to an open, democratic peaceful and secure internet, respecting human rights and freedom of expression"
- called for a strengthening of the implementation of the Chemical Weapons Convention
- agreed to work together to combat climate change – particularly with reference to "small island developing states"
- to coordinate efforts countering extremism as well as human trafficking.
- agreed that Rwanda will host the next CHOGM in 2020 (later rescheduled as CHOGM in 2022 due to the COVID-19 pandemic) and that Samoa would host the CHOGM in 2022 (later rescheduled as CHOGM in 2024 due to the COVID-19 pandemic).

The leaders also issued a statement announcing their decision that Prince Charles would be the next Head of the Commonwealth.

== Commonwealth Forums ==
Parallel Commonwealth Summit Forums were held at the Queen Elizabeth II Conference Centre from 16 to 19 April, with 5,000 participants attending from government, business, and civil society engaged in Women's, Youth, and Peoples Forums with a Business Forum being held at Guildhall. A joint plenary of all four fora was held for the first time on 17 April.

The Commonwealth Summit Forums saw participation from a number of Commonwealth heads of government and ministers. UK Prime Minister Theresa May opened the Business Forum on 16 April 2018 and South African President Cyril Ramaphosa delivered a keynote address at the Business Forum Banquet.

Various members of the royal family—including The Prince of Wales and the Duchess of Cornwall; Prince William, Duke of Cambridge, and the Duke and Duchess of Sussex— hosted and participated in various receptions and events being held as part of the forums or the heads of government meeting itself. Prince Harry, in his new role as Commonwealth Youth Ambassador, opened the Youth Forum telling delegates: "In my new role, I will work to support the Queen, my father the Prince of Wales, and my brother William, all of whom know that young people are the answer to the challenges of today."

On the final day of the meeting, Prince Harry and Meghan Markle attended a reception to promote women's empowerment and girls' education.
