= 2015 Commonwealth Heads of Government Meeting =

Meeting of international leaders

24th Commonwealth Heads of Government Meeting CHOGM 2015
- Host country: Malta
- Dates: 27–29 November 2015
- Cities: Valletta; Għajn Tuffieħa, Mellieħa; St. Julian's; Birgu
- Venues: Mediterranean Conference Centre; Radisson Golden Sands; Corinthia Palace Hotel; Fort St. Angelo (retreat)
- Participants: 53
- Heads of State or Government: 35
- Chair: Joseph Muscat (Prime Minister of Malta)
- Follows: 2013
- Precedes: 2018
- Website: chogm2015.mt

Key points
- Climate change and global sustainability Extremism, terrorism and security Refugee crisis Economic issues Election of Secretary-General; Decriminalisation of homosexuality Corruption

The 2015 Commonwealth Heads of Government Meeting, also known as CHOGM 2015, was the 24th Meeting of the Heads of Government of the Commonwealth of Nations. It was held in Malta from 27 to 29 November. Sri Lankan President Maithripala Sirisena handed the position of Commonwealth Chair-in-Office to Maltese Prime Minister Joseph Muscat at the meeting.

All 53 Commonwealth member states were represented at the summit, including 35 by their heads of state or government.

== Background ==
The summit, which was originally designated to be hosted by Mauritius, was given to Malta when the Mauritian Prime Minister Navin Ramgoolam refused to attend the CHOGM 2013 over the human rights situation prevailing in the host country, Sri Lanka, and thus withdrew as the host of the 2015 summit as protocol had required him to attend the summit in order to personally invite other member states.

== Venues ==
The summit was held at various venues in Valletta and Għajn Tuffieħa's Golden Bay with retreats at Fort St. Angelo in Birgu. The opening ceremony and reception were held at the Mediterranean Conference Centre in Valletta with executive and special sessions held at the Radisson Golden Sands at Golden Beach. Most press conferences were being held at the InterContinental Hotel in St. Julian's. The official theme of the event was "The Commonwealth - Adding Global Value". A series of civil society conferences in the form of a People's Forum, Women's Forum, Youth Forum and Business Forum were held in the days leading up to the main summit and explored avenues such as building democracy and rule of law, championing small states, creating economic opportunities, empowering youth, inclusive development, human rights, and public service reform among Commonwealth nations.

Due to poor weather, the official welcoming ceremony for the royal party occurred at San Anton Palace rather than an open air event at St. George’s Square in Valletta as originally planned.

== Commonwealth Secretary General election ==
The meeting elected a new Commonwealth Secretary-General to succeed Kamalesh Sharma who was due to retire in April 2016 at the end of his second term, the maximum that could be served.

Candidates for the position included Antiguan ambassador to the United States and former high commissioner to the United Kingdom Sir Ronald Sanders; former Attorney General for England and Wales Baroness Patricia Scotland, nominated by her native country of Dominica; and former deputy secretary-general for political affairs Mmasekgoa Masire-Mwamba, nominated by Botswana. Former Australian foreign minister and Liberal Party leader Alexander Downer, serving as Australia's High Commissioner to the United Kingdom, was suggested by British and Australian officials as a possible compromise candidate. Trinidad and Tobago's former planning minister Bhoendradatt Tewarie and Tanzanian foreign minister Bernard Membe were both nominees earlier in the process but withdrew as candidates before the summit began. The election took take place on 27 November.

Baroness Patricia Scotland was elected the 6th Commonwealth Secretary-General after two rounds of voting and took office on 1 April 2016. According to Antigua's foreign minister, Charles "Max" Fernandez, while the CARICOM countries largely backed Sir Ronald Sanders over Baroness Scotland, African countries favoured Masire-Mwamabe: "After the first round, Sir Ron received the fewest votes. For the second round, Antigua & Barbuda put its support behind Baroness Scotland because we felt we'd be supporting the candidate from another Caribbean country." Fernandez also asserted that Scotland had the support of "European" and Pacific states. Australia also supported Baroness Scotland after its compromise candidate, Alexander Downer, failed to obtain support. Sanders had been seen as the leading candidate prior to the summit, particularly as the Caribbean Commonwealth countries argued it was their turn to have a secretary-general come from their region, however the failure of the entire CARICOM to support Sanders and a Daily Telegraph article published two days prior to the summit accusing him of corruption may have damaged his campaign.

For the first time in Commonwealth history, the Commonwealth Foundation organised a debate between the candidates as part of the Commonwealth People's Forum. This was held on 25 November - two days before the election - in the Maltese House of Representatives. It was chaired by the Speaker of the House, Angelo Farrugia, who took questions from members of civil society present in the chamber. The three declared candidates at the time of debate - Masire-Mwamba, Sir Ronald and Baroness Scotland - were all present. Two representatives of the Maltese parliament also attended and spoke briefly at the end of the debate.

== Agenda ==
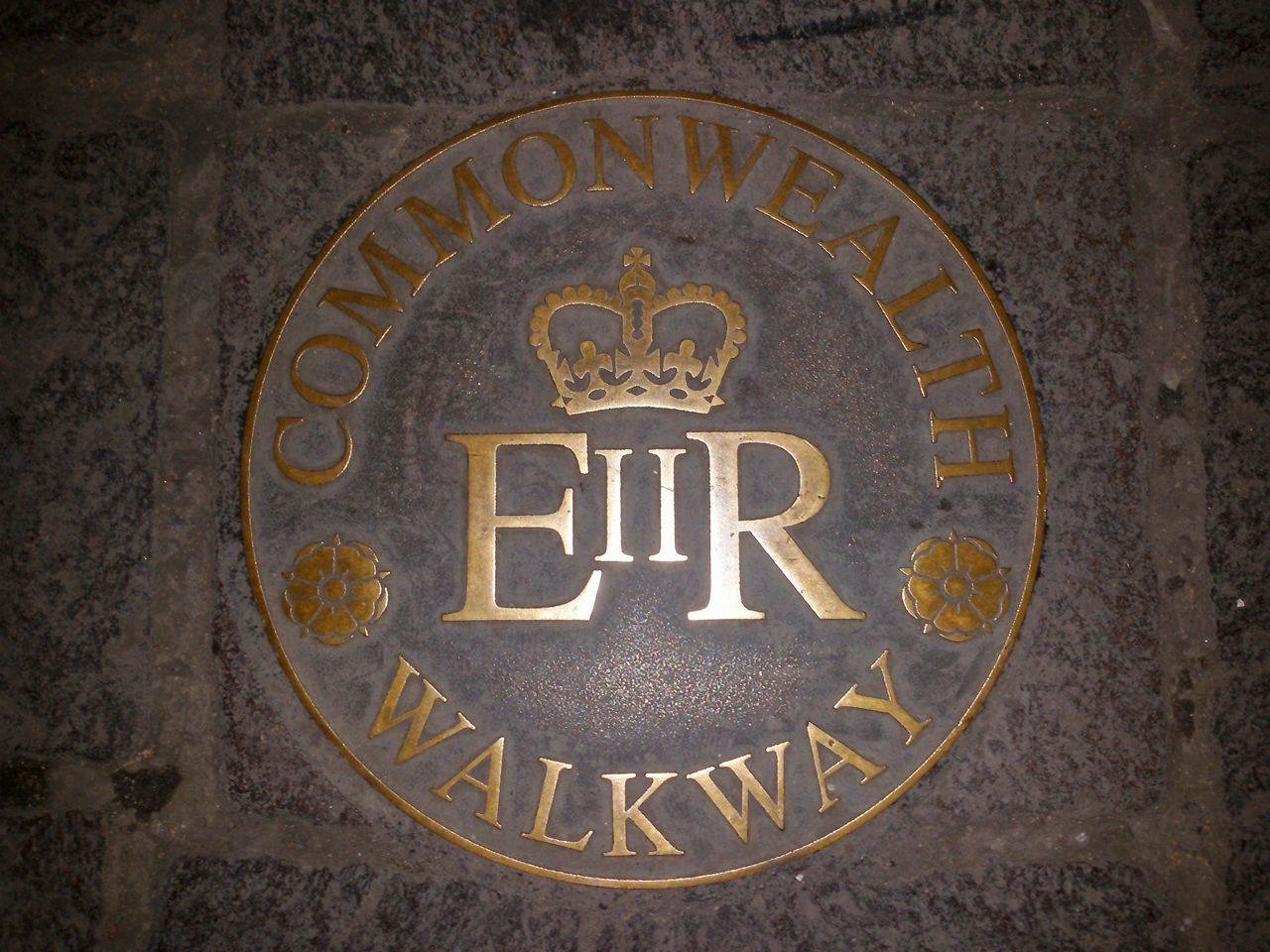
Floor plaque commemorating the walkway of the Commonwealth in front of Auberge de Provence

The Commonwealth meeting was held immediately prior to the United Nations Climate Change Conference in Paris. The Commonwealth conference accordingly held a special session on climate change and global sustainability in an attempt to build political support around the issue prior to the Paris summit; In consideration of small island nations that are being threatened by rising sea levels that accompany climate change, a proposal was discussed to allow these countries to write off their debts in exchange for taking measures to protect the environment.

The summit, being held in the aftermath of the November 2015 Paris attacks and growing conflict with ISIL, also addressed terrorism and security issues and the European migrant crisis, as well as economic and trade issues. corruption, The continued criminalization of homosexuality in 40 of the Commonwealth's 53 members was not on the official agenda but was an issue brought up by civil society groups and was also raised by both Prime Minister Joseph Muscat (chairing the occasion) and British Prime Minister David Cameron during their remarks to the Commonwealth leaders. In addition, newly elected Commonwealth Secretary-General Patricia Scotland, Baroness Scotland of Asthal committed herself to using the first two years of her tenure to promote decriminalization of homosexuality in Commonwealth countries that continue to forbid same-sex relationships. Cameron also pledged to increase cooperation among members to deal with "poisonous ideologies" and violent extremism.

The leaders also chose a new venue for the next summit, originally scheduled for 2017, as Vanuatu, which was originally selected as host, rescinded its offer to host due to the long-term effects of devastation to the island nation's infrastructure caused by Cyclone Pam in March 2015. It was determined that Britain would host the next CHOGM in London in the spring of 2018, delayed from late 2017 due to other international commitments. Accordingly, the 26th CHOGM that was planned for Malaysia in 2019 was pushed back to 2020.

== Attendees ==
All 53 Commonwealth member states were represented at the summit, with 35 represented by heads of state or government.

Elizabeth II attended in her capacity as Head of the Commonwealth, accompanied by the Duke of Edinburgh, the Prince of Wales and the Duchess of Cornwall. The summit coincided with a state visit to Malta by Elizabeth II as Queen of the United Kingdom, her first visit to the country since 2007. It was also her final overseas visit as monarch.

Secretary-General of the United Nations Ban Ki-moon and French President François Hollande addressed a special session on climate change ahead of the 2015 United Nations Climate Change Conference in Paris. Ban and Hollande's predecessor, Nicolas Sarkozy, had attended the 2009 Commonwealth Heads of Government Meeting in advance of the Copenhagen climate conference.

Several heads of government were absent and sent ministers or other representatives instead. Indian Prime Minister Narendra Modi did not attend amid disagreements over proposals to restrict coal-fired electricity generation and greenhouse gas emissions. Tongan Prime Minister ʻAkilisi Pōhiva remained at home because of health concerns and domestic priorities. Solomon Islands Prime Minister Manasseh Sogavare also stayed home because of parliamentary business, while Vanuatu Prime Minister Sato Kilman was unable to attend amid a political crisis that led to the dissolution of parliament and a snap election.

Kenya was represented by its High Commissioner at the opening ceremony, as President Uhuru Kenyatta did not arrive until the second day of the summit.

The following table lists the heads of delegation recorded by the Commonwealth Secretariat.

Country	Representative	Position
Commonwealth	Elizabeth II	Head of the Commonwealth
Commonwealth	Kamalesh Sharma	Secretary-General
Antigua and Barbuda	Gaston Browne	Prime Minister
Australia	Malcolm Turnbull	Prime Minister
Bahamas	Perry Christie	Prime Minister
Bangladesh	Abul Hassan Mahmood Ali	Minister of Foreign Affairs
Barbados	Freundel Stuart	Prime Minister
Belize	Wilfred Elrington	Minister of Foreign Affairs
Botswana	Ian Khama	President
Brunei	Prince Abdul Mateen	Representative of the Head of Government
Cameroon	Philémon Yang	Prime Minister
Canada	Justin Trudeau	Prime Minister
Cyprus	Nicos Anastasiades	President
Dominica	Charles Savarin	President
Fiji	Frank Bainimarama	Prime Minister
Ghana	John Dramani Mahama	President
Grenada	Keith Mitchell	Prime Minister
Guyana	David A. Granger	President
India	Sushma Swaraj	Minister of External Affairs
Jamaica	Arnold J. Nicholson	Minister of Foreign Affairs and Foreign Trade
Kenya	Uhuru Kenyatta	President
Kiribati	Anote Tong	President
Lesotho	Pakalitha Mosisili	Prime Minister
Malawi	Peter Mutharika	President
Malaysia	Ahmad Zahid Hamidi	Deputy Prime Minister
Maldives	Ali Naseer Mohamed	Permanent Secretary for Foreign Affairs
Malta	Joseph Muscat (Chair-in-office)	Prime Minister
Mauritius	Anerood Jugnauth	Prime Minister
Mozambique	Filipe Nyusi	President
Namibia	Hage Geingob	President
Nauru	Baron Waqa	President
New Zealand	John Key	Prime Minister
Nigeria	Muhammadu Buhari	President
Pakistan	Nawaz Sharif	Prime Minister
Papua New Guinea	Rimbink Pato	Minister of Foreign Affairs
Rwanda	Anastase Murekezi	Prime Minister
Samoa	Tuilaepa Sailele Malielegaoi	Prime Minister
Seychelles	James Mancham	Representative of the Head of Government
Sierra Leone	Victor Bockarie Foh	Vice-President
Singapore	Tharman Shanmugaratnam	Deputy Prime Minister
Solomon Islands	Manasseh Maelanga	Deputy Prime Minister
South Africa	Maite Nkoana-Mashabane	Minister of International Relations and Cooperation
Sri Lanka	Maithripala Sirisena	President
Saint Lucia	Kenny Anthony	Prime Minister
Saint Kitts and Nevis	Timothy Harris	Prime Minister
Saint Vincent and the Grenadines	Clifton Burgin	Minister of Health, Wellness and the Environment
Eswatini	Barnabas Sibusiso Dlamini	Prime Minister of Swaziland
Tonga	Semisi Tauelangi Fakahau	Minister of Agriculture, Food, Forestry and Fisheries
Trinidad and Tobago	Keith Rowley	Prime Minister
Tuvalu	Enele Sopoaga	Prime Minister
Uganda	Edward Ssekandi	Vice-President
United Kingdom	David Cameron	Prime Minister
Tanzania	James Msekela	Ambassador to Malta
Vanuatu	Christopher Emelee	Deputy Prime Minister
Zambia	Muyeba Chikwonde	High Commissioner to the United Kingdom

== Outcomes ==
=== Climate change ===
The leaders agreed on and issued the Commonwealth Leaders’ Statement on Climate Action which called climate change an "existential threat" to many states and called for the upcoming 2015 United Nations Climate Change Conference (COP21) to produce "an ambitious, equitable, inclusive, rules-based and durable outcome ... that includes a legally binding agreement" to reduce greenhouse gas emissions and control climate change. The statement asserted that "many of our most vulnerable states and communities are already facing the adverse impacts of climate change ... (and) for some it represents an existential threat." The leaders also called for developed nations to spend $100 billion a year by 2020 to help developing countries deal with the effects of climate change. To that end, Canada pledged $2.65 billion over five years to help developing countries tackle climate change. The UK committed £21 million for disaster management and £5.5 million for the ocean-based economy whilst Australia has committed $1 million for a new Commonwealth initiative, the Climate Finance Access Hub, and India pledged $2.5 million in assistance. A $1 billion Commonwealth Green Finance Facility, proposed by the Prince of Wales, was also created to support environmental projects among poor Commonwealth nations.

=== Peace and security ===
The final Communiqué issued by leaders at the end of the CHOGM also addressed the issues of peace and security, affirming that "radicalisation, violent extremism and terrorism in all its forms and ramifications are serious threats to the whole world" and called upon Commonwealth members to fully implement United Nations Security Council Resolution 2178 (2014) on terrorism and extremism and called for the implementation of "national strategies to counter radicalisation, violent extremism and terrorism" including education and the addressing of grievances and alienation by susceptible individuals, particularly young people. The Commonwealth leaders also agreed to a British proposal to create a new unit of experts to counter extremism. The body will be run by the Commonwealth Secretariat, which will combat radicalisation and terrorist recruitment across the Commonwealth. Australia has committed $2.5 million to the unit in addition to a £5 million by Britain.

The Communiqué also encouraged all countries to accede to and fully implement the Arms Trade Treaty of 2014 in order to curtail the illicit trade in conventional weapons including small arms.

=== Human rights, good governance, and migration ===
The statement also reaffirmed commitments to human rights and good governance, and respect for rule of law and democratic principles and "agreed to enhance national and international efforts to address the causes of irregular migration including prevention and abatement of conflict and violent extremism and terrorism; eradicating poverty and promoting sustainable economic development; strengthening the rule of law; nurturing inclusive and pluralist political systems; combatting organised crime, human trafficking and people smuggling, and modern day slavery; and reinforcing respect for human rights" and called for international co-operation and the adherence of international law in regards to migration, calling on "all stakeholders to work towards a lasting solution to this global issue".

=== Sustainable development ===
On the issue of sustainable development leaders adopted the 2030 Agenda for Sustainable Development and called for its implementation in the hopes that it would "lead to the eradication of poverty in all its dimensions and ensure no one is left behind" and also agreed to "provide continued assistance to member states in attaining long-term debt sustainability by means of technical advice on institutional strengthening, debt financing, debt strategy formulation and debt restructuring."

=== Other issues ===
The Communiqué also touched on the concerns of small states, pledging to advocate internationally on their behalf, trade, in particular pledging to augment access to trade and investment finance for small, vulnerable, or developing states, youth, and the importance of developing youth leadership, gender equality and women's empowerment, calling in particular for continued efforts to "prevent and eliminate child, early and forced marriage and female genital mutilation", public health, underlining the importance of immunization programs to tackle diseases such as malaria and committing states to the eradication of polio as a global priority, and calling "on the Commonwealth at large to support the strengthening of policies for universal health coverage in order to build strong and resilient health systems that will, in turn, enable better responses to public health threats and emergencies".

The meeting also called for easier movement of Commonwealth citizens between member states.

=== Country issues ===
Leaders also welcomed progress on continuing national and regional issues such as improve bilateral relations between Belize and Guatemala and their border disagreement, reaffirmed its call for the implementation of existing United Nations resolutions on the Cyprus dispute, expressed solidarity with Guyana in its ongoing border dispute with Venezuela.

== See also ==
- Valletta Summit on Migration
- 2015 United Nations Climate Change Conference
