= Commonwealth Secretary-General =

Head of the Commonwealth Secretariat

Secretary-General of the Commonwealth of Nations
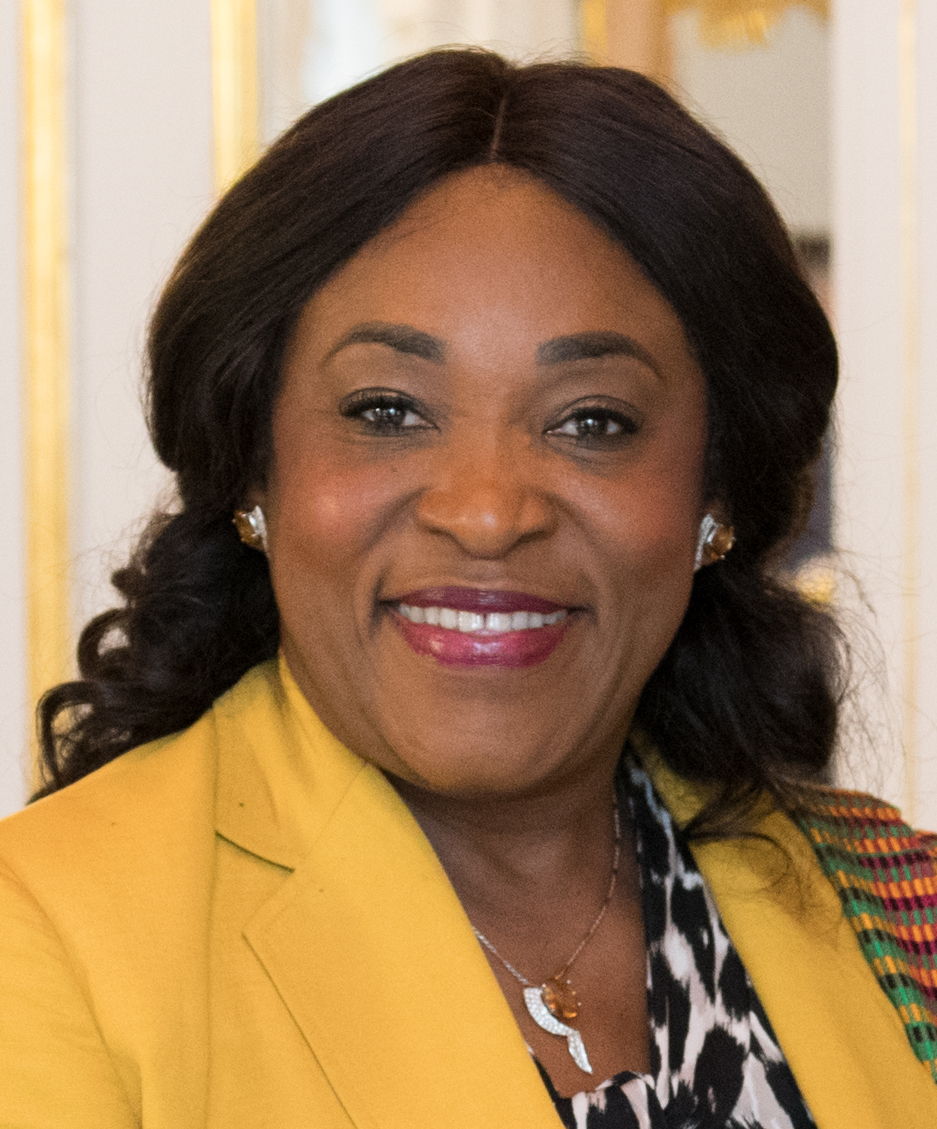
- Incumbent; Shirley Ayorkor Botchwey since 1 April 2025
- Style: Her Excellency
- Residence: Garden House
- Appointer: Commonwealth Heads of Government
- Term length: Four years renewable once
- Inaugural holder: Arnold Smith
- Website: Official website

The Commonwealth secretary-general, formally the secretary-general of the Commonwealth of Nations, is the head of the Commonwealth Secretariat, the central body which has served the Commonwealth of Nations since its establishment in 1965, and responsible for representing the Commonwealth publicly. The Commonwealth secretary-general should not be confused with the head of the Commonwealth.

== Role ==
The position was created, along with the Secretariat itself, after the fourteenth Commonwealth Prime Ministers Conference in London in 1965, issued a memorandum describing the role of the Secretary-General:

Both the Secretary-General and his/her staff should be seen to be the servants of Commonwealth countries collectively. They derive their functions from the authority of Commonwealth Heads of Government; and in the discharge of his/her responsibilities in this connection the Secretary-General should have access to Heads of Government...

The headquarters of the secretary-general, as with the Secretariat generally, is Marlborough House, a former royal residence in London, which was placed at the disposal of the Secretariat by Queen Elizabeth II, who was the head of the Commonwealth. However, as the building cannot house all of the Secretariat's staff in London, additional space is rented elsewhere in London. From this operational base, a large part of the secretary-general's work involves travelling around the Commonwealth keeping in personal contact with those at the heart of the governments of member states.

The secretary-general receives a salary of nearly £160,000 (2015) and a four‑storey mansion, Garden House, in Mayfair as an official residence.

== Staff and responsibility ==
The secretary-general leads the Commonwealth Secretariat, and all Secretariat staff are responsible and answerable to them. They are supported by three deputy secretaries-general, which are elected by the Commonwealth heads of government via the members' high commissioners in London. Currently, the three deputy secretaries-general are Deodat Maharaj, Gary Dunn and Josephine Ojiambo. Until 2014, only two deputy secretaries-general were appointed along with an assistant secretary-general for corporate affairs. The secretary-general may appoint junior staff at their own discretion, provided the Secretariat can afford it, whilst more senior staff may be appointed only from a shortlist of nominations from the heads of government. In practice, the Secretary-General has more power than this; member governments consult the secretary-general on nominations, and the secretary-general has also at times submitted nominations of his own.

Formally, the secretary-general is given the same rank as a high commissioner or ambassador. However, in practice, their rank is considerably higher. At CHOGMs, they are the equal of the heads of government, except with preference deferred to the longest-serving head of government. At other ministerial meetings, they are considered primus inter pares. For the first three years of the job's existence the Foreign Office refused to invite the secretary-general to the Queen's annual diplomatic reception at Buckingham Palace, much to Arnold Smith's irritation, until in 1968 this refusal was over-ridden by Queen Elizabeth II herself.

The secretary-general was originally required to submit annual reports to the heads of government, but this has since been changed to reporting at biennial Commonwealth Heads of Government Meetings (CHOGM). The secretary-general is held responsible by the Commonwealth's Board of Governors in London.

Between 2016 and 2019, the staff of the Commonwealth secretariat declined in number, from 295 to 223.

== Election ==
Since the 1993 CHOGM, it has been decided that the secretary-general is elected to a maximum of two four-year terms. The election is held by the assembled heads of government and other ministerial representatives at every other CHOGM. Nominations are received from the member states' governments, who sponsor the nomination through the election process and are responsible for withdrawing their candidate as they see fit.

The election is held in a Restricted Session of the CHOGM, in which only heads of government or ministerial representatives thereof may be present. The chair of the CHOGM (the head of government of the host nation) is responsible for ascertaining which candidate has the greatest support, through the conduct of negotiations and secret straw polls.

Secretaries-general seeking a second term in office are often elected unopposed. Although this practice was occasionally deemed to be a convention, it was broken by a Zimbabwe-backed bid for Sri Lankan Lakshman Kadirgamar to displace New Zealand's Don McKinnon in 2003. At the vote, however, Kadirgamar was easily defeated by McKinnon, with only 11 members voting for him against 40 for McKinnon. In March 2019, the 53 high commissioners, meeting in London, confirmed the unwritten rule allowing secretaries-general to be challenged for a second term.

At the 2011 CHOGM, India's Kamalesh Sharma was re-elected to his second term unopposed. Sharma had won the position at the 2007 CHOGM, when he defeated Malta's Michael Frendo to replace McKinnon, who had served the maximum two terms.

At the 2015 CHOGM, Patricia Scotland, a former British cabinet minister, was nominated for Commonwealth secretary-general by her native country of Dominica and defeated Antiguan diplomat Sir Ronald Sanders and former deputy secretary-general for political affairs Mmasekgoa Masire-Mwamba of Botswana to become the 6th Commonwealth secretary-general and the first woman to hold the post. She took office on 1 April 2016. Lady Scotland's re-election to a second term was challenged at the 2022 Commonwealth Heads of Government Meeting but she won a second term, reportedly defeating Jamaican foreign minister Kamina Johnson Smith by a margin of 27 votes to 24. As the CHOGM had been delayed by two years due to the COVID-19 pandemic, Scotland agreed to only serve for two additional years.

At the 2024 CHOGM, Ghanaian foreign minister Shirley Ayorkor Botchwey was elected to succeed Baroness Scotland. She will begin her tenure as secretary-general on 1 April 2025.

== List of secretaries-general ==
| No. | Portrait | Name | Country | Term start | Term end | Background | Head (Tenure) |
|---|---|---|---|---|---|---|---|
| 1 | | Arnold Smith | Canada | 1 July 1965 | 30 June 1975 | Canadian ambassador to Egypt (1958–1961); Canadian ambassador to the USSR (1961–1963) | Elizabeth II (1952–2022) |
| 2 | | Sir Shridath Ramphal | Guyana | 1 July 1975 | 30 June 1990 | Foreign Minister of Guyana (1972–1975) | Elizabeth II (1952–2022) |
| 3 | | Emeka Anyaoku | Nigeria | 1 July 1990 | 31 March 2000 | Deputy Secretary-General for Political Affairs (1977–1990) | Elizabeth II (1952–2022) |
| 4 | | Don McKinnon | New Zealand | 1 April 2000 | 31 March 2008 | Deputy Prime Minister of New Zealand (1990–1996); Minister of Trade (1990–1996); Minister of Foreign Affairs (1990–1999) | Elizabeth II (1952–2022) |
| 5 | | Kamalesh Sharma | India | 1 April 2008 | 31 March 2016 | Permanent Representative of India to the United Nations (1997–2002); Indian High Commissioner(2004–2008) | Elizabeth II (1952–2022) |
| 6 | | Patricia Scotland Baroness Scotland of Asthal | Dominica; United Kingdom | 1 April 2016 | 31 March 2025 | Attorney General (2007–2010); Minister of State (Home Office; 2003–2007); Parliamentary Secretary (Lord Chancellor's Department; 2001–2003); Under-Secretary of State at the Foreign and Commonwealth Office (1999–2001); House of Lords (1997–present) | |
| 6 | | Patricia Scotland Baroness Scotland of Asthal | Dominica; United Kingdom | 1 April 2016 | 31 March 2025 | Attorney General (2007–2010); Minister of State (Home Office; 2003–2007); Parliamentary Secretary (Lord Chancellor's Department; 2001–2003); Under-Secretary of State at the Foreign and Commonwealth Office (1999–2001); House of Lords (1997–present) | Charles III (2022–present) |
| 7 | | Shirley Ayorkor Botchwey | Ghana | 1 April 2025 | Incumbent | Minister for Foreign Affairs for Ghana (2017–2025) | Charles III (2022–present) |
