= Duties of local government in the United Kingdom =

The duties of local government in the United Kingdom concern the functions, powers and obligations of local government in England, Wales, Scotland and Northern Ireland. While the Local Government Act 1972 and the Localism Act 2011 set out general powers to do anything necessary to fulfill their duties, and to act with full capacity (such as a limited company can), there is no codified list of powers set out in a statute. Instead, there are around 220 duties found in various pieces of legislation falling under the Ministry of Housing, Communities and Local Government, and 1120 pieces of legislation falling under other departments. Further local devolution is anticipated following the 2024 King's Speech under an "English Devolution Bill"

== List of powers ==
=== Department of Communities administered duties ===
In 2011, there were 220 legislative duties of local authorities for which the Department of Communities is responsible.

Accountability
Legislation	Year Introduced	Title of Duty	Function
Local Government Act Section 112	1972	Appoint officers.	Gives Local Authorities the ability to appoint the staff that it needs.
Local Government Act Section 151	1972	Designate a chief finance officer and Make arrangements for the proper administration of their financial affairs and secure that one of their officers has responsibility for the administration of those affairs.	Local Authorities must have a Chief Finance Officer.
Local Government Act	1972	Allow public to access certain meetings and documents.	Required to ensure transparency.
Local Government Act Section 148	1972	Keep a fund to be known as the county fund.	Foundation of the local government finance system.
Local Government Act Section 168	1972	Make a financial return to the Secretary of State for each year ending on 31st March, or such other day as the Secretary of State may direct.	Management of financial system and macro economic management.
Local Government Act Section 230	1972	Send the Secretary of State such reports and returns, and give him such information with respect to their functions, as he may require or as may be required by either House of Parliament.	Provides assurances that may be required to assure Parliament of proper management of Local Government.
Local Government Act Section 99 and Schedule 12	1972	Comply with rules on meetings and proceedings in Schedule 12 to the LGA Local Government Act e.g. hold an annual meeting, record the names of members present at a meeting, draw up minutes of proceedings of a meeting.	Core to ensuring proper democratic accountability.
Local Government Act	1974	Take certain steps in response to reports from the Local Government Ombudsman.	Core accountability mechanism.
Local Government Act	1986	Have regard to a code of practice on publicity.	To comply with the code of practice on publicity.
LGA 1972 and the Parish and Community Meetings Rules	1987	Comply with parish poll rules where a poll is demanded at a parish meeting.	Core accountability mechanism for parish councils for voters in parishes.
Local Government and Housing Act	1989	Designate officers as head of paid service and monitoring officer.	Leader to designate head of paid service and monitoring officer to - ensure propriety and regularity.
Local Government and Housing Act	1989	Adopt standing orders.	Part of the propriety regime.
Local Government and Housing Act	1989	Allocate appointments according to voting strength of political groups.	Ensures representation of minority parties on committees by requiring politically mixed committees where a democratic mandate has created that environment.
Local Government and Housing Act	1989	Adopt a scheme for payment of allowances to councillors.	Enables councillors to be paid for their work as councillors and includes the duty to have an independent panel to consider/agree allowances.
Local Government Act Section 3	1999	Best value duty.	Requires authorities to secure continuous improvement in exercising functions, having regard to a combination of economy, efficiency & effectiveness.
Local Government Act Section 22A	2000	Provide information to an overview and scrutiny committee of another authority.	Information to Overview and Scrutiny Committee in another authority if required.
Local Government Act Section 21B	2000	Respond to its own overview and scrutiny committee	A Local Authority must respond to its Overview and Scrutiny Committee - part of its executive arrangements
Local Government Act	2000	Prepare a Sustainable Community Strategy and associated duty to consult.	The duty to prepare a Sustainable Community Strategy is to ensure Local Authorities set an overall strategic direction and long term vision for the economic, social and environmental well-being of a local area in a way that contributes to sustainable development in the United Kingdom. The Local Authority is required to consult and seek participation of each partner authority in preparation or modification of their Sustainable Community Strategy.
Local Government Act Section 21ZA	2000	Upper tier & unitary authorities to appoint a scrutiny officer.	An officer must be appointed with responsibility for the Overview and Scrutiny Committee.
Local Government Act	2000	Adopt a code of conduct for members and co-opted members.	
Local Government Act Section 21(1) and Local Authorities (Executive and Alternative Arrangements) (Modification of Enactments and Other Provisions) (England) Order 2001	2001	Appoint one or more overview and scrutiny committees.	Creation of executive arrangements.
Local Government Act 1999 Section 3A inserted by section 138 of the Local Government and Public Involvement in Health Act	2007	Involve local representatives.	The duty seeks to ensure people have greater opportunities to have their say. It encourages authorities and their partners to embed a culture of engagement and empowerment and change into their daily activities, and consider, as a matter of course, the possibilities for provision of information to, consultation with and involvement of representatives of local persons across all authority functions.
Local Government and Public Involvement in Health Act Section 106	2007	Prepare a draft Local Area Agreement (LAA) when directed to do so by the Secretary of State .	To ensure all top tier Local Authorities prepare a Local Area Agreement when directed to do so by the Secretary of State.
Local Government and Public Involvement in Health Act Section 106 (2-3)	2007	Duty to consult and cooperate.	To ensure there is a joined-up, cross-sector approach to agreeing local priorities.
Local Government and Public Involvement in Health Act Section 108	2007	Have regard to Local Area Agreement targets.	Yes - cost, time and staffing resource burden on planning for delivery against particular targets Local Area Agreements.
Local Government and Public Involvement in Health Act Section 113	2007	Publish information about Local Area Agreements when targets are designated by the Secretary of State.	Yes - cost, time and staffing resource burden on preparing, publishing and updating information about particular targets Local Area Agreements.
Local Government and Public Involvement in Health Act Section 83	2007	Undertake a community governance review (CGR)	Key element of local democracy - requires district councils to act where local people want to create a parish council.
Local Government and Public Involvement in Health Act Section 84	2007	Respond to a petition for a community governance review (where a community governance review is already being undertaken).	Key element of local democracy - requires district councils to act where local people want to create a parish council.
Local Democracy, Economic Development and Construction Act Section 130	2009	Where a multi area agreement has effect, each local authority for the area covered by the agreement and each partner authority for that area must in exercising the functions have regard to every improvement target specified in the agreement that relates to it.	Multi area agreements whereby partners have a statutory duty to have regard to specific targets relating to their activities.
Local Authorities (Overview and Scrutiny Committees) (England) Regulations	2009	County council or executive of such a council to respond to the overview and scrutiny committee of an associated district council.	
Local Democracy, Economic Development and Construction Act Section 69	2009	Prepare assessments of the economic conditions of their areas (Local Economic Assessments).	Strong local economic evidence bases.
Local Democracy, Economic Development and Construction Act	2009	Promote democracy (not yet commenced).	
Local Democracy, Economic Development and Construction Act	2009	Have a petitions scheme (as from 15 June 2010).	To standardise petitions procedures for local authorities.

Accounting and Finance
Legislation	Year Introduced	Title of Duty	Function
Local Government Finance Act Section 25	1992	Budget calculations: report on robustness of estimates etc - where an authority to which s32 or s43 of the Local Government Finance Act 1992 (billing or major precepting authority) or s85 of the Greater London Authority Act 1999 (GLA) applies is making calculations in accordance with that section, the chief finance officer of the authority must report to it on the following matters: a) the robustness of the estimates made for the purposes of the calculations b) the adequacy of the proposed financial reserves. An authority to which a report under this section is made must have regard to the report when making decisions about the calculations in connection with which it is made.	Safe and prudent budgeting by local authorities on revenue account
Local Government Finance Act Section 27	1992	Budget calculations: report on inadequacy of controlled reserve: where an authority to which s32 or s43 of the Local Government Finance Act 1992 (billing or major precepting authority) or s85 of the Greater London Authority Act 1999 (GLA) applies is making calculations in accordance with that section, if in relation to the previous financial year it appears to the chief finance officer that a controlled reserve is or is likely to be inadequate, he must report to the authority on: a) the reasons for that situation and b) the action, if any, which he considers it would be appropriate to take to prevent such a situation arising in relation to the corresponding reserve for the financial year under consideration. An authority to which a report under this section is made must have regard to the report when making decisions about the calculations in connection with which it is made.	Regular budget monitoring by local authorities
Local Government Finance Act Section 28	1992	Budget monitoring: general: where in relation to a financial year an authority to which s32 or s43 of the Local Government Finance Act 1992 (billing or major precepting authority) applies has made the calculations required by that section, it must review them from time to time during the year. If as a result of carrying out the review, it appears to the authority that there has been a deterioration in its financial position, it must take such action as it considers necessary to deal with the situation.	Regular budget monitoring by local authorities
Local Government Finance Act Section 29	1992	Budget monitoring Greater London Authority: requirement for the Greater London Authority to review calculations, where it has made those calculations required by s85 Greater London Authority Act 1999, and where there has been a deterioration in its financial position, it must take such action as it considers necessary to deal with the situation or, if a functional body, report the deterioration to the Mayor of London and the Chair of the London Assembly.	Regular budget monitoring by Greater London Authority and its functional bodies
Audit Commission Act Section 27	1998	Keep their accounts, prepare and certify their accounts, deposit their accounts, and publish information relating to their accounts in accordance with the regulations prescribed by the Secretary of State. These regulations are the Accounts and Audit Regulations 2003, SI 2003/533, as amended.	Sound financial management, regular production of published accounts and proper conduct of external audit
Audit Commission Act Section 32B	1998	The Commission may require local authorities to provide it with such data as the Commission may reasonably require for the purpose of conducting data matching exercises. It is a criminal offence not to comply.	Enables the Commission's National Fraud Initiative to operate.
Audit Commission Act Section 48	1998	The Audit Commission has the power to require bodies subject to audit (including local authorities) to provide the Commission with all such information as the Commission may reasonably require for the discharge of its functions under this Act. It is a criminal offence not to comply.	Enables the AC to carry out audits.
Accounts and Audit Regulations	2003	Relevant bodies (which include Local Authorities) are responsible for ensuring that the financial management of the body is adequate and effective, which includes a requirement for a review once a year of the effectiveness of the system of internal control.	Ensures regular assessment of financial management and internal controls; statement is published with annual accounts
Accounts and Audit Regulations	2003	A relevant body must maintain an adequate and effective system of internal audit of its accounting records and of its system of internal control in accordance with the proper practices in relation to internal control.	Ensures sound internal audit maintained and gives access powers for internal auditors
Local Government Act	2003	Duty to determine affordable borrowing limit – a Local Authority must determine and keep under review how much money it can afford to borrow. The duty is to be performed in accordance with regulations made by the Secretary of State (Local Authorities (Capital Finance and Accounting) (England) Regulations 2003, SI 2003/3146).	Determines affordable borrowing limit as part of prudential borrowing regime.
Local Government Act Section 14	2003	Supply the Secretary of State with such information relating to the matters dealt with in Chapter 1, and at such time, as he may request.	Provides way of checking on operation of capital finance provisions.
Local Government Act Section 15	2003	Have regard to such guidance as the Secretary of State may issue (e.g. guidance on investments).	Makes possible the issue of user-friendly statutory guidance on investments
Local Authorities (Capital Finance and Accounting) (England) Regulations, Regulation 27	2003	Duty to charge to revenue account a minimum amount for that financial year in respect of the financing of capital expenditure incurred by the Local Authority in that year	Ensures LAs make prudent provision for repaying debts.
Local Democracy, Economic Development and Construction Act Section 37	2009	Notify Audit Commission where company, limited liability partnership or industrial and provident society connected with the Local Authority meets certain conditions specified by the Secretary of State (not yet commenced).	Ensure the Audit Commission is aware of LA companies

Building Act
Legislation	Year Introduced	Title of Duty	Function
Building Act s59	1984	Drainage: Service of a notice requiring provision or repair of foul water drainage system	Prevention of risk to health
Building Act s64	1984	Sanitary Convenience: Service of a notice requiring sufficient sanitary conveniences to be provided	Prevention of risk to health
Building Act s65	1984	Provision of sanitary conveniences in workplaces. Local Authorities shall by notice require owner or occupier of the building to provide sanitary conveniences	Prevention of risk to health
Building Act s72	1984	Means of escape from fire: Service of a notice requiring provision for adequate means of escape from fire	Prevention of risk to safety
Building Act s78(2)	1984	Dangerous building-emergency measures: Notice of intention to take action under 78 (1) where reasonably practicable	Prevention of risk to safety.
Building Act s91	1984	Duties of Local Authorities: Local Authorities must carry out duties imposed on them in the Building Act and the Building Regulations	Local Authorities compliance with duties imposed on them
Building Act s91a	1984	Registers: Local Authorities to maintain a public register of prescribed information relating to their duties under the Building Act	Public availability of information
Building Act s92	1984	Form of Documents: All documents issued, made or given by Local Authority under the Act, must be in writing.	To ensure that there is a physical record, and to reduce the risk of discrepancies between parties.
Building Act s99(1)	1984	Notice requiring works: Local Authority notices must indicate the type of work to be executed, and the time within which the work must be done, where it is stated that s.99 applies.	Clarity of what is required of the person on whom the notice is served - particularly as s.99(2) enables the Local Authority to execute the works and recover costs if the person notified does not do so within the specified time.
Building Act s100 (2)	1984	Sale of materials: Where the Local Authority sells any material under 100 (1) they shall after deducting their expenses, pay all proceeds to the person who the materials originally belonged to.	To ensure that the Local Authority are not profiting from the sale of another's confiscated materials
Building Act s104	1984	Local Authority to give effect to court orders where the court of appeal varies or reverses a decision of the Local Authority	To ensure that the Local Authority carries out court orders
Building Act s106 (1)	1984	Compensation for damage: Local Authorities shall make full compensation to anyone who has sustained damage as a result of exercise by the Local Authority of its powers under the Act where the person has not been in default themselves in relation to the matter.	To ensure that Local Authorities are financially responsible for damage caused and not to penalise persons who are not at fault.

Council Tax and Council Tax Capping
Legislation	Year Introduced	Title of Duty	Function
Local Government Finance Act	1992	To levy and collect council tax	to enable billing authorities to set, and collect council tax.
Local Government Finance Act for billing authorities and sections 43 to 48 for major precepting authorities.Sections 32 to 36	1992	Each financial year to calculate budget requirements and levels of council tax	to enable local authorities to calculate budget requirements and level of council tax
Local Government Finance Act Section 65	1992	Each financial year to consult representatives of persons subject to non-domestic rates about proposals for expenditure	To enable Local Government Finance system to operate
Local Government Finance Act Section 68	1992	To provide information to the Secretary of State if required to do so.	to provide information to the Secretary of State on request
Local Government Finance Act Chapter 4A	1992	Where capping action is taken against a billing or a major precepting authority the authority is required to undertake substitute calculations and to meet various requirements when doing so.	This ensures that final capping decisions by Ministers and (when challenged by an authority) Parliament, are put into effect. Authorities must calculate a new (reduced) budget requirement level.
Local Government Finance Act Section 52Y	1992	Billing and major precepting authorities must provide certain types of information to the Secretary of State if required to do so.	To help ensure that Secretary of State has all the relevant information to hand when making decisions in relation to council tax capping
Council Tax (Administration and Enforcement) Regulations Regulations 8 and 14	1992	Each financial year to take reasonable steps to ascertain whether any dwellings in their areas are exempt dwellings, or whether council tax discounts apply.	Allows Local Authorities to ascertain whether a discount or an exemption are correctly applied
Council Tax (Administration and Enforcement) Regulations Regulation 10	1992	To notify the residents or owners of dwellings which are exempt from council tax.	Linked to the above regulations. Allows Local Authorities to make assumptions
Council Tax (Administration and Enforcement) Regulations 18 to 21	1992	Each financial year to serve a demand notice on every person liable to pay council tax demanding the payment of council tax.	Allows Local Authorities to issue demand notices
Council Tax (Administration and Enforcement) Regulation 31	1992	Each financial year to make final adjustments in cases where the sums paid are either less or more than a person's liability to council tax.	allows Local Authorities to adjust a demand notice
Council Tax (Demand Notices) (England) Regulations	2009	Duties in relation to matters to be contained in, and information to be supplied with, council tax demand notices ('Council Tax bills'). Council Tax bills are issued by billing authorities, who must include the matters specified in Part 2 of Schedule 1 in the bills (regulation 6) and supply the information in Part 2 of Schedule 2 when they serve those bills (regulation 7).	Prescribes the information that goes with demand notices
Council Tax (Demand Notices) (England) Regulations 9 and 10	2009	Precepting authorities and levying bodies are also required to provide information to billing authorities when they issue precepts or levies.	Prescribes the information, from local precepting bodies, that goes with demand notices

Executive Arrangements
Legislation	Year Introduced	Title of Duty	Function
Local Authorities (Standing Order)(England) Regulations (made under ss 8, 9 and 20 of the Local Government and Housing Act).	1989	Make or modify standing orders so that they include the provisions set out in the Regulations – e.g. in relation to staff.	Elements of executive arrangements
Local Government Act Sections 11(2) to (5)	2000	Executive of a local authority must take one of the specified forms.	Elements of executive arrangements
Local Government Act. Section 33E(2) Details of what the proposals must contain are listed at section 33E(3)	2000	Local authority which wants to change its governance arrangements must draw up proposals for the change.	Elements of executive arrangements
Local Government Act Section 33A	2000	Where a local authority still operates ‘old’ leader and cabinet executive arrangements, it must make a change in arrangements.	Elements of executive arrangements - this duty will end after December 2010
	2000	Hold a referendum on its proposals before taking any steps to implement a change in governance arrangements if (a) existing proposals were subject to approval in referendum, or (b) the Local Authorities proposals under section 33E state that the change will be subject to approval in referendum	Elements of executive arrangements
Local Government Act Section 38	2000	Have regard to any guidance for the time being issued by the Secretary of State for the purposes of Part 2 of the Local Government Act 2000	Elements of executive arrangements
Local Government Act Section 45	2000	Abide by the result of the referendum	Elements of executive arrangements
Local Authorities (Referendums) (Petitions and Directions) (England) Regulations 2000 These regulations are made under section 34 (petitions) and section 35	2000	Certain duties on local authorities in connection with actions which may, may not or must be taken when they receive compliant petitions from local electors (or when they are directed to hold a referendum by the Secretary of State) to hold a referendum on whether the authority should operate a certain form of executive.	Elements of executive arrangements
Local Government Act Section 37	2000	Prepare a written constitution and keep it up to date.	Elements of executive arrangements
Local Government Act Section 44 and 105	2000	Certain duties on Local Authorities in holding mayoral referendums and mayoral elections.	Electoral procedures

Finance
Legislation	Year Introduced	Title of Duty	Function
Local Government Finance Act Sections 114 to 116	1988	Reporting duties of section 151 officer	This duty requires the officer to report to members if the authority has or is about to take action or make a decision that is unlawful, or if it appears to the officer that the authority will not have sufficient resources to finance its expenditure for the financial year.

Fire and Rescue Authorities
Legislation	Year Introduced	Title of Duty	Function
Firefighters' Compensation Scheme (England) Order The Firefighters' Pension Scheme (England) Order and the Firefighters' Pension Scheme Order.	2006	Fire and Rescue Authorities are subject to a number of duties both as employing authorities and as administering authorities for the two firefighters' pension schemes.	Provide a statutory framework as a public service pension scheme
Fire and Rescue Service Act S6	2004	Make provision for the purpose of promoting fire safety.	This duty embeds the promotion of fire safety as a core duty of each Fire and Rescue Authority
Fire and Rescue Service Act S7	2004	Make provision for the purposes of extinguishing fires and protecting life and property.	This duty embeds the principle of prevention as a core duty of each Fire and Rescue Authority and ensures it delivers more to its communities than an operational response to fire. It is not prescriptive and allows Fire and Rescue Authorities to undertake whatever fire prevention (aka community fire safety) activities they consider reasonable and appropriate. Their decision is locally determined based on an assessment of risks within their communities and resource availability
Fire and Rescue Service Act S8	2004	Make provision for the purpose of rescuing people in the event of road traffic accidents.	See above re National Framework requirement for Fire and Rescue Authorities to produce an Integrated Risk Management Plan . Risk Task Assessment /response will be part of the Integrated Risk Management Plan assessment.
Fire and Rescue Services (Emergencies)(England).	2004	Make provision for chemical, biological, radiological or nuclear emergency and urban search and rescue.	The aim of the Emergencies Order is to improve national resilience to disruptive incidents such as terrorist attacks and serious accidents by giving Fire and Rescue Authorities in England mandatory functions in connection with CBRN and USAR emergencies. This underpins the New Dimension programme.
Fire and Rescue Services S13	2004	Enter into, and give effect to, reinforcement scheme with other Fire and Rescue Authorities.	Section 13 Reinforcement Schemes are legal agreements between participating Fire and Rescue Authorities made under section 13 of the Fire and Rescue Service Act. Such schemes enable participants to share out any expenses that come from taking measures to operate the scheme. They require the participants to notify the Secretary of State of the scheme's initial making, subsequent variation and any final revocation.
Fire and Rescue Services S21 (7)	2004	Have regard to the National Framework	
Fire and Rescue Services S26	2004	Provide reports, returns and information required by Secretary of State	The power to require information eg to monitor national trends, to support the power of the Secretary of State to intervene in a fire authority if necessary.
Fire and Rescue Services S38	2004	Take all reasonable measures to secure water supply	An adequate supply of water for fire-fighting
Regulatory Reform (Fire Safety) Order, Fire Precautions (Sub-surface Railway Stations) (England) Regulations and Fire Precautions (Sub-surface Railway Stations) (England) Regulations	2005	Fire and Rescue Authorities are enforcing authorities under article 25 of the Regulatory Reform (Fire Safety) Order 2005 and must have due regard to guidance issued by the Secretary of State under article 26	Simplified, rationalised and consolidated a vast array of fire safety legislation into a single Order. Provides the only legislative means to ensure the fire safety of the public and employees in commercial and public buildings, and is clearly based on the goal-based approach taken by wider health & safety legislation. It applies to England and Wales.
Art 45 Regulatory Reform (Fire Safety) Order	2005	Duty on local authority to consult the enforcing authority for the purposes of the Regulatory Reform (Fire Safety) Order 2005 (usually the Fire and Rescue Authority) before passing plans for the erection or alteration or change of use of a building.	Whilst the duty is on the local authority (building control) or Approved Inspector to draw the Fire and Rescue Service attention to the fire precautions they believe are necessary in the completed the building, the art 45 requirement on the Fire and Rescue Service is, where helpful, to pass back details of where they think additional fire safety measures may be needed as part of that consultation process (ie, within 15 working days). The aim is to provide for appropriate fire safety to be designed into the building from an early stage and so avoid burdening the ultimate occupier by having to put in place additional measures to deliver an acceptable level of safety.

Functions and Responsibilities
Legislation	Year Introduced	Title of Duty	Function
Local Government Act	2000	Local authority’s functions to be discharged by an executive of the authority, unless those functions are specified as functions that are not to be the responsibility of the authority’s executive.	Elements of executive arrangements
Functions and Responsibilities Regulations	2000	Functions which are not to be executive functions are set out in the Local Authorities (Functions and Responsibilities) Regulations 2000 (as heavily amended) and local authorities must exercise their functions in accordance with these Regulations.	Elements of executive arrangements
Functions and Responsibilities Regulations Section 13	2000	Where a function is a “local choice function” (i.e. it may or may not be an executive function) obligation on local authorities to make provision as to the exercise of such functions in their executive arrangements.	Elements of executive arrangements

Housing
Legislation	Year Introduced	Title of Duty	Function
Caravan Sites and Control of Development Act Section 3	1960	To consider caravan site licence applications submitted by applicants.	Places a duty on local authorities to license all privately owned residential caravan sites( including park home sites) and holiday sites to ensure they are fit for purpose
Land Compensation Act Section 39	1973	Duty to rehouse residential occupiers displaced by a compulsory purchase order or housing order where no affordable alternative accommodation is available.	To prevent people displaced by compulsory purchase (or a housing order), who cannot obtain somewhere else to live on reasonable terms from becoming homeless.
Housing Act Section 8	1985	Periodically review the housing needs of its area in relation to housing conditions and the needs of the district.	Ensure local authorities understand the housing needs of their communities. Further legislation requires that when authorities carry out a review under s. 8, that they have regard to the special needs of chronically sick or disabled persons (section 3 of Chronically Sick and Disabled Person's Act 1970, as amended) and carry out reviews of accommodation needs of gypsies and travellers residing in or resorting to their district (s. 224, Housing Act 2004).
Housing Act Section 5	1985	Comply with the requirements of the legislation where a tenant exercises the right to buy.	To provide the terms and conditions of the statutory Right to Buy scheme
Housing Act Section 12	1985	To seek consent to use housing assets for non-housing purposes	To ensure council rents are spent for the benefit of council tenants
Housing Act Section 19	1985	To seek consent to cease using housing assets for housing purposes	To ensure council rents are spent for the benefit of council tenants
Housing Act Section 27	1985	To seek the consent of the Secretary of State to delegate housing management functions to another organisation	To ensure that local authorities consult their tenants before delegating management functions
Housing Act Sections 32 to 34	1985	To obtain consent for certain disposals of housing assets as determined by the Secretary of State	To ensure that local authorities do not dispose of social housing to the detriment of its housing needs
Housing Act Section 43	1985	To obtain consent for the disposal of non-housing assets occupied by secure tenants	To protect the rights of tenants
Housing Act Schedule 3A	1985	To consult tenants before their homes are sold to a private landlord	To protect tenants' rights.
Landlord and Tenant Act Section 21	1985	Provide written summary of service charge costs to leaseholders when requested.	Ensure leaseholders have access to minimum levels of information about their service charge payments.
Landlord and Tenant Act Section 22	1985	Provide leaseholders facilities for inspecting (or copies of) supporting documentation if requested following receipt of summary.	Ensure that leaseholders have access to documentation supporting the summary if required.
Landlord and Tenant Act Section 21B	1985	Provide a summary of rights and obligations with service charge demands.	Ensure leaseholders are aware of their rights and obligations when receiving demands for service charges.
Landlord and Tenant Act	1985	Provide summary of insurance cover to leaseholders on request and then reasonable facilities for inspecting policy	Ensure leaseholders have access to minimum levels of information about the insurance they pay for as a service charge and to supporting documentation.
Landlord and Tenant Act Section 20	1985	Undertake a prescribed consultation process when entering contracts for 'major works' or 'qualifying long term agreements'.	Ensure leaseholders are kept informed and have input into procurement process that will lead to them paying significant sums as service charges.
Local Government and Housing Act Section 74	1989	To keep a housing revenue account recording the income and outgoings relating to the housing stock acquired under Part 2 of the Housing Act 1985.	To maintain a ringfence between the Housing Revenue Account and the general Fund and prevent tenants subsidising council tax, and Council Tax payers subsidising Local Authority housing.
Local Government and Housing Act Section 76	1989	To prevent debit balance on Housing Revenue Account.	To stop the Housing Revenue Account running up a deficit.
Local Government and Housing Act Section 77	1989	If authority chooses to keep one, to keep Housing Repairs Account in accordance with proper practices and prevent it from running into deficit	Record of income & expenditure on maintenance/repair of the stock.
Leasehold Reform Housing and Urban Development Act1 Section 11 &12	1993	Provide information about superior interests and other specified information relevant to an enfranchisement application to leaseholders when requested.	Ensure that leaseholders of flats have access to information that may be required when exercising enfranchisement rights.
Leasehold Reform Housing and Urban Development Act Section 21	1993	Provide counter notice when leaseholders apply to buy freehold (or else leaseholders acquire on their terms).	Necessary part of process to enable collective rights for enfranchisement of flats to proceed.
Leasehold Reform Housing and Urban Development Act Section 45	1993	Provide counter notice when a leaseholder applies for lease extension (or else leaseholders acquire on their terms).	Necessary part of process to enable individual rights to lease extensions for flats to be exercised.
Housing Grants, Construction and Regeneration Act Section 1	1996	To provide facilities for disabled persons in dwellings	Provides that Local Authorities must give grants to disabled persons (subject to means testing and up to a prescribed maximum) to allow them to adapt their homes to meet their needs.
Housing Act S166	1996	Secure that advice and information is available free of charge to persons in their district about the right to make an application for an allocation of accommodation.	Provides clarity to Local Authorities and applicants on making an application for an allocation of social housing.
Housing Act S167, S168	1996	Have an allocation scheme, publish a summary of it and allocate housing accommodation in accordance with the scheme.	Provides clarity to Local Authorities and applicants on the framework for allocating social housing.
Housing Act Part 7,	1996	Duty to make inquiries into cases of homelessness or threatened homelessness	Places a duty on housing authorities to make inquiries to establish whether any duty is owed under Part 7 - if there is reason to believe an applicant may be homeless or likely to become homeless within 28 days
Housing Act Part 7	1996	Co-operation in certain cases involving children	Places a duty on housing authorities to make arrangements to ensure that social services are aware of cases where applicants with children may be ineligible for assistance, intentionally homeless, or intentionally threatened with homelessness.
Housing Act, Part 7	1996	Interim duty to accommodate in case of apparent need	Places a duty on housing authorities to secure accommodation pending inquiries in cases where they have reason to believe the applicant may be eligible for assistance, homeless and in priority need
Housing Act, Part 7	1996	Duty to persons becoming homeless intentionally	Places a duty on authorities to ensure provision of advice and assistance for applicants who are eligible for assistance and intentionally homeless (and, where applicant has priority need, secure accommodation for period that will provide a reasonable opportunity for applicant to secure accommodation for himself)
Housing Act, Part 7,	1996	Duty to persons not in priority need who are not homeless intentionally	Places a duty on housing authorities to ensure provision of advice and assistance for applicants who are unintentionally homeless and not in priority need
Housing Act, Part 7	1996	Duty to persons with priority need who are not homeless intentionally	Places a duty on housing authorities to secure accommodation for applicants who are eligible for assistance, unintentionally homeless and in priority need
Housing Act, Part 7	1996	Duties in case of threatened homelessness	Places a duty on housing authorities to take reasonable steps to secure that accommodation does not cease to be available for applicants eligible for assistance, unintentionally threatened with homelessness and in priority need
Housing Act, Part 7	1996	Duties to applicant where case is considered for referral or referred	Places a duty on housing authorities to secure accommodation for an applicant pending resolution of a referral to another authority
Housing Act, Part 7	1996	Discharge of functions: out of area placements	Places a requirement on housing authorities to secure accommodation within their own district so far as reasonably practicable
Housing Act, Part 7	1996	Protection of property: supplementary provisions	Places a duty on housing authorities to take reasonable steps to mitigate loss or damage to applicant's property where no other suitable arrangements have been made (and duty to secure accommodation is owed)
Housing Act Part 7	1996	Co-operation between relevant housing authorities and bodies	Places a duty on local authorities and other relevant bodies to co-operate, on request, in providing reasonable assistance to help an authority discharge its functions under Part 7
Housing Act, Part 7	1996	Co-operation in certain cases involving children	Places a duty on housing authorities to make arrangements to ensure that social services are aware of cases where applicants with children may be ineligible for assistance, intentionally homeless, or intentionally threatened with homelessness.
Housing Act, Part 7	1996	Duty of local housing authority to provide advisory services	Places a duty on authorities to ensure that advice about homelessness and the prevention of homelessness is available free to everyone in their district
Audit Commission Act Section 2	1998	To submit Housing Revenue Account to an annual audit.	
Commonhold and Leasehold Reform Act Section 166	2002	Demand ground rent in a prescribed form (otherwise not due).	Ensures that leaseholders are aware when ground rent is due.
Commonhold and Leasehold Reform Act Schedule 11	2002	Provide a summary of rights and obligations with administration charge demands.	Ensure leaseholders are aware of their rights and obligations when receiving demands for service charges.
Homelessness Act	2002	Duty of local housing authority to formulate a homelessness strategy	Places a duty on housing authorities to publish a new homelessness strategy at least every 5 years and take it into account in discharging its functions
Local Government Act, Part 7	2003	Duty of local housing authority to formulate and publish a housing strategy [not actually commenced]	Places a duty on local authorities to set out objectives and targets and policies on how the authority intends to manage and deliver its strategic housing role
Housing Act Section 3	2004	Keep the housing conditions in their area under review with a view to identifying any action that may need to be taken under various specified pieces of legislation.	Requires the Local authority to know about the condition of all housing stock in its area
Housing Act Section 4	2004	Inspect premises in specified circumstances with a view to establishing whether there is a "hazard".	Requires the Local Authority to inspect a dwelling to see if there are any hazards under the Housing Health and Safety Rating System
Housing Act Section 5	2004	Take appropriate enforcement action where a category 1 hazard exists.	Places a duty on Local Authorities to take action where condition of a property can cause a risk to health of occupant
Housing Act Section 10	2004	Consult with the fire and rescue authority for the area where a fire hazard exists before taking enforcement action.	Local Authorities must consult with Fire and Rescue authority within a Houses in Multiple Occupation before taking enforcement action
Housing Act Sections 16 and 25	2004	Revoke improvement notice and prohibition order, as appropriate, in specified circumstances.	Provides for the Local Authorities to revoke notices once action by the owner has occurred
Housing Act Part 2	2004	Mandatory licensing of Houses in Multiple Occupation (HMOs)	Places a duty on local authorities to licence all Houses in Multiple Occupations that are of three or more storeys, housing five or more persons in two or more households.
Leasehold Reform, Housing and Urban Development Act Section 136 as amended by the Local Authorities (Capital Finance) (Consequential, Transitional and Saving Provisions) Order	2004	Authorities are required to pay a levy when the capital receipt received from the sale of its stock is greater than the housing debt attributable to those dwelling houses.	Provides clarity to Local Authorities on the procedure to maximise capital receipts
Housing and Regeneration Act Section 114A	2008	Notify the regulator (the Tenant Services Authority) as soon as it becomes subject to compulsory registration i.e. it becomes or intends to become a provider of social housing.	Provides that the regulator to be advised of the existence of new social housing providers in the LA sector that are eligible for regulation. This is a requirement that supports cross domain (between Housing Association and Local Authority) regulation.
Housing and Regeneration Act Section 128	2008	Send certain documents (accounts and Audit Commission reports) to the regulator.	Provides that registered social housing providers give copies of their accounts (and certain other relevant documents) to the regulator. This is a requirement that supports regulation.
Housing Grants, Construction and Regeneration Act	1996	To provide facilities for disabled persons in dwellings	Provides that Local Authorities must give grants to disabled persons (subject to means testing and up to a prescribed maximum) to allow them to adapt their homes to meet their needs.

Local Government Finance
Legislation	Year Introduced	Title of Duty	Function
Local Government and Finance Act Section 41	1988	Billing authority to deposit a copy of the relevant local rating list at its principal office.	The duty ensures that the public can find out the rateable values of properties in their area.
Local Government Finance Act Section 42A	1988	Compile and maintain a rural settlement list in accordance with section 42B	The duty ensures that billing authorities are able to provide rural rate relief.
Local Government and Finance Act - Section 43 (occupied hereditaments: liability), 45 (unoccupied hereditaments: liability) and 45A Local Government and Finance Act (Unoccupied hereditaments: zero rating).	1988	Obligations relating to rate reliefs (Although there are no explicit obligations imposed on billing authorities under these sections, the combined effect of these provisions and the provisions on collection of rates (see further para 3 below) is that it is for billing authorities to determine whether a ratepayer is entitled to relief under the legislation).	Allows billing authorities to collect rates on empty properties and provide reliefs on those properties.
Local Government and Finance Act Act Schedule 8	1988	Billing authorities are obliged, once directed by the Secretary of State, to calculate their estimated contribution of rates to the national non-domestic rates pool; to pay their contribution into the pool during the financial year; and to make final calculations and, where necessary, final payments into the pool after the end of the financial year.	The duty ensures that Local Authorities are able to make payments to the central rates pool according to the revenues they are collecting from ratepayers and that at the end of the year to where necessary make a final payment or receive a refund if they have over/under paid the central pool
Local Government and Finance Act Schedule 9	1988	Billing authorities to a) provide certain information to valuation officers and b) to give anyone requesting it access to certain information about relevant local rating list.	To provide information to the Valuation Office Agency so that a liable property for rates can be rated and correctly billed.
Non-Domestic Rating (Collection and Enforcement) (Local Lists) Regulations 4 to 8	1989	Serve a demand notice on every person liable to pay rates demanding the payment of rates and to serve reminder notices and final notices in the event that the ratepayer fails to pay one or more of the instalments once they have fallen due.	To collect the tax from the ratepayer
Non-Domestic Rating (Collection and Enforcement) (Local Lists) Regulation 9	1989	Each financial year to make final adjustments in cases where the sums paid are either less or more than a person's liability to business rates.	To ensure ratepayers pay the right amount of rates - including refunds for overpayments.
Non-Domestic Rating (Collection and Enforcement) (Local Lists) Regulations Schedule 1B	1989	To administer the business rates deferral scheme.	Allows billings authorities to administer the business rates deferral scheme.
Council Tax and Non-Domestic Rating (Demand Notices) (England) Regulations	2003	Rates bills are issued by billing authorities, who must include the matters specified in Part 1 of Schedule 2 in the bills (regulation 3).	To provide information on how the rates bill is calculated and applicable relief's available to the ratepayer
Local Government Act (Business Improvement Districts) and the Business Improvement Districts (England) Regulations 2004 Part 4	2003	Billing authorities have the power to make Business Improvement District arrangements with respect to an area and to impose a levy on ratepayers in that area. Where a billing authority makes Business Improvement District arrangements under these powers, the 2003 Act and the 2004 Regulations impose certain obligations on the billing authority in relation to the administration, collection etc of that levy.	To allow Local Authorities to create a Business Improvement District - and collect and enforce the Business Improvement District levy
Business Rate Supplements Act Section 20	2009	Obligation on billing authorities to calculate the chargeable amount of Business Rates Supplement (BRS) for each person who is subject to a BRS (section 20). (This obligation only applies to billing authorities in whose area a BRS has been levied).	To calculate the Business Rates Supplement tax for each liable ratepayer
The Business Rate Supplements (Transfers to Revenue Accounts) (England) Regulations	2009	Billing authorities who collect Business Rates Supplement on behalf of a levying authority obliged to make certain calculations and to transfer Business Rates Supplement revenues from their collection fund to the relevant levying authority’s Business Rates Supplement revenue account at various times throughout the financial year.	To ensure that the revenues collected by the billing authority are transferred to the upper tier authority who has levied the Business Rates Supplement
The Business Rate Supplements (Collection and Enforcement) (England) Regulations amending the Non-Domestic Rating (Collection and Enforcement) (Local Lists) Regulations and Demand Notices Regulations.	2010	Where a ratepayer is liable to pay a Business Rates Supplement the billing authority is obliged to bill for that Business Rates Supplement as part of the normal billing process for national non-domestic rates and to include in the ratepayer’s rates bill, certain information about the Business Rates Supplement.	To Demand form the liable ratepayer the Business Rates Supplement tax

Local Government Pension Scheme (LGPS)
Legislation	Year Introduced	Title of Duty	Function
LGPS Regulations (Benefits, membership and Contributions) Regulations LGPS (Transitional Provisions) Regulations LGPS (Administration) Regulations LGPS (Management and Investment of Funds) Regulations	1997	Local authorities are subject to a number of duties both as Local Government Pension Scheme employing authorities or as Local Government Pension Scheme administering authorities (some authorities are both employing and administering authorities).	Provide a statutory framework as a public service pension scheme

Local Planning Authorities (LPAs)
Legislation	Year Introduced	Title of Duty	Function
Planning (Listed Buildings and Conservation Areas) Act Section 69	1990	Determine from time to time, which parts of its area should be conservation areas.	To identify those areas of historical and architectural interest that should benefit from the protections in the 1990 Act
Planning (Listed Buildings and Conservation Areas) Act Section 66	1990	In considering whether to grant planning permission affecting a listed building or its setting, have special regard to the desirability of preserving the building or its setting.	To prevent damage to the fabric or setting of a listed building by ensuring that the effects on any such building are a material consideration when considering a relevant planning application.
Planning (Listed Buildings and Conservation Areas) Act Section 71	1990	Publish proposals for the preservation and enhancement of conservation areas.	By definition, conservation areas are places which should be conserved. Without active management they could degrade and lose their reason for existence.
Planning (Listed Buildings and Conservation Areas) Act Section 72	1990	Exercise certain functions paying special attention to the desirability of enhancing or preserving the appearance of conservation areas	To ensure that when exercising other functions with respect to buildings or land in a conservation area (particularly the grant of planning permission) special attention is paid to preserving or enhancing the character or appearance of the area.
Town and Country Planning Act Section 65	1990	Duties imposed on Local Planning Authorities by order under this section relating to publicity of planning applications.	Ensures that planning applications given adequate publicity - to give members of the public an opportunity to know about and, if they choose, make representations on planning applications.
Town and Country Planning Act Section 69	1990	Keep register of various applications made under this Act.	Ensures that local authorities maintain a register of planning applications and decisions, this is then freely accessible to members of the public.
Town and Country Planning Act Section 70(2)	1990	Have regard to development plan and other material considerations in determining planning and other applications.	Sets out principles of decision making for local authorities.
Town and Country Planning Act, Section 71	1990	By order not to determine applications for planning permission before end of prescribed period and to consult and further duty to consult other local authority when granting consent for caravans	Sets out that Local Planning Authorities cannot make decisions until consultation is complete
Town and Country Planning Act Section 73	1990	Duties about how to consider application to develop land without compliance with planning condition.	to allow developers to make minor amendments to planning permissions without having to submit a new planning application.
Town and Country Planning Act Section 74	1990	How to determine planning applications.	Sets out principles of decision making for local authorities.
Town and Country Planning Act Section 76A	1990	Refer application for planning permission to Secretary of State for major infrastructure project when directed to by Secretary of State	
Town and Country Planning Act Section 77	1990	Refer application for planning permission to Secretary of State when directed to either in a specific case or because of a general direction.	Ensures that certain types of cases are referred to the Secretary of State for his consideration of whether they should be called in.
Town and Country Planning Act Section 78	1990	Give notice of decisions within prescribed periods	gives applicants the right of appeal against a decision by a Local Planning Authority
Town and Country Planning Act Section 83	1990	Determine from time to time whether to designate any part of their area as a Simplified Planning Zone if regional strategy identifies a need for one (and connected procedures in other sections).	To ensure local authorities consider, from time to time, the case for creating areas where simplified planning arrangements are in place. Simplified Planning Zones remove the requirement for planning permission for specified development
Town and Country Planning Act Section 97	1990	Have regard to development plan and other material considerations when deciding whether or not to revoke or modify a planning permission (and connected procedures under other provisions to be complied with in order to revoke or modify permission).	Section 97 of the Town and Country Planning Act 1990 enables Local Planning Authorities and Mineral Planning Authorities - in respect of minerals development- to make an order revoking or modifying a planning permission . This section enables the orders to impose restoration conditions on minerals planning consents.
Town and Country Planning Act, Section 106A(7)	1990	Give notice of determination of application to vary or discharge planning obligation within prescribed period.	Require authorities to give notice of their decision to the applicant within a period prescribed by the Secretary of State
Town and Country Planning Act Section 107	1990	Pay compensation for revocation or modification of planning permission.	To compensate applicants for removal or change to right to develop which has already been granted
Town and Country Planning Act Section 108	1990	Pay compensation for withdrawal or modification of planning permission granted by development order	Applies s107 where planning permission is refused where it is normally granted by a development order. In practice, where the Local Planning Authority makes an article 4 direction removing permitted development rights and a subsequent planning application is refused, compensation is payable
Town and Country Planning Act Section 109	1990	Apportion compensation under section 107.	Procedural provision for s107. If practicable, the Local Planning Authority shall apportion any compensation for depreciation in value to various parts of the land.
Town and Country Planning Act Section 110	1990	Give notice to Secretary of State where compensation includes compensation for depreciation	Procedural provision under s107. The Local Planning Authority must notify the Secretary of State of any compensation for depreciation and any apportionment under s109.
Town and Country Planning Act Section 115	1990	Pay compensation where discontinuance order made	Fairness to landowners, whose legal development are required to be removed by a discontinuance notice.
Town and Country Planning Act Section 139	1990	Respond to purchase notice	fairness to affected landowners. It requires the Local Planning Authority to respond to a purchase notice within 3 months: either to accept it, gain the agreement of another Local Authority or statutory undertaker to accept it or to refer it to the Secretary of State for determination.
Town and Country Planning Act Section 191	1990	To issue certificates of lawful existing use or development or refuse applications	To establish the lawfulness of development
Town and Country Planning Act Section 192	1990	To issue certificates of lawful proposed use or development or refuse applications	To establish the lawfulness of development
Town and Country Planning Act Section 197	1990	Include appropriate provision for the protection of tree in a planning permission.	To ensure that appropriate trees are retained, protected and planted as part of the planning process and help to deliver sustainable development.
Town and Country Planning Act Section 203	1990	Pay compensation arising under tree preservation orders.	To make provision for the payment of compensation for loss or damage caused or incurred as a result of refusal of consent or granting consent subject to conditions.
Town and Country Planning Act Section 204	1990	Pay compensation where requirement to replant trees.	To make provision for the payment of compensation for loss or damage caused or incurred in complying with a replanting direction in a woodland, where the Forestry Commission decide not to make a grant under the Forestry Act 1979.
Town and Country Planning Act Section 223	1990	Pay compensation for expense of removing prohibited advertisements	The payment of compensation where in order to comply with the 2007 Regulations, works are carried out to remove any advertisement which was being displayed on 1 August 1948 or for discontinuing the use of a site for the display of advertisements that was used on that date
Town and Country Planning Act Schedule 9	1990	i) Paragraphs 5 and 6 enables Mineral Planning Authorities to make suspension orders in respect of sites were minerals development has taken place but which has been temporarily suspended.ii) Paragraph 3 enables an Mineral Planning Authority to prohibit the resumption of working on a mineral site	To suspend minerals workings to deal with an environmental problems on the site. To prohibit minerals extraction if it is unlikely to be worked in the future.

Party Walls
Legislation	Year Introduced	Title of Duty	Function
Party Wall etc. Act s10(8)	1996	The appointing officer (appointed by the Local Authority and appointed only for the purposes of this section), may appoint a third surveyor, where either of the two current surveyors refuse to select a third surveyor.	To ensure that the mechanism in place in section 10(8) for when the surveyors have failed to appoint a third surveyor as required to do so in section 10, is able to be carried out.

Planning
Legislation	Year Introduced	Title of Duty	Function
Small Holdings and Allotments Act Section 23	1908	Allotment authorities (that is, parish councils, or where there isn't one, district councils) must provide a sufficient number of allotments and let them to persons resident in the area (where they are of the opinion that there is a demand).	Intended to ensure that Local Authorities provide sufficient number of allotments for those in their area that want one
Planning (Hazardous Substances) Act and Planning (Hazardous Substances) Regulations.	1992	Certain duties for hazardous substances authorities- for example, to consider and determine applications for hazardous substances consent and consult prescribed bodies.	To ensure control of hazardous substances
Planning and Compensation Act Schedule 2	1991	Mineral planning authorities to determine applications for registration of old mining permission and to register the permissions	The 1991 Act introduced requirements for the review and updating of Interim Development Order mineral planning permissions. These are planning permissions which were granted between 1943-1948.
Environment Act Schedule 13	1995	Mineral planning authorities to review old mineral permissions	The 1995 Act introduced the requirement for the review and updating of old mineral permissions and the periodic review of all mineral permissions thereafter.
Town and Country Planning (Environmental Impact Assessment) (England and Wales) Regulations Regulation 3	1999	Local Planning Authorities to take into account environmental assessment before granting planning or subsequent consent under a planning permission for certain categories of development	Transposes requirement of the Environmental Impact Assessment Directive 85/337/EEC
Environmental Assessment of Plans and Programmes Regulations Regulation 5	2004	Local Planning Authorities responsible for strategic environmental assessment of certain plans during their preparation - applies to development plan documents	Transposes requirement of the Strategic Environmental Assessment Directive 2001/42/EC
Local Democracy, Economic Development and Construction Act Section 71(1) (to be repealed in the Localism Bill)	2009	Make a scheme for the establishment and operation of a Leaders' Board (and various subsidiary duties in the same section).	
Local Democracy, Economic Development and Construction Act (to be repealed in the Localism Bill) Sections 73 to 77	2009	Member of a Leaders' Board- various duties on local authorities regarding the revision of a regional strategy and its implementation.	

Planning and Compulsory Purchase
Legislation	Year Introduced	Title of Duty	Function
Planning and Compulsory Purchase Act S13	2004	Survey and keep under review certain matters which affect the development of their area or the planning of its development.	Equip Local Planning Authorities with intelligence needed for it to determine range and scope of development plans required.
Planning and Compulsory Purchase Act S14	2004	Keep under review those matters which may be expected to affect development in that area or the planning of that development, in so far as the development relates to a county matter.	Equip Local Planning Authorities with intelligence needed for it to determine range and scope of development plans required.
Planning and Compulsory Purchase Act and S30 Greater London Authority Act S15	2004	Prepare and maintain a local development scheme (LDS), which is effectively a project plan for the preparation of local development documents (LDDs). LPAs must submit LDS to Secretary of State and if a London LPA also to the mayor of London.	Public document setting out timetable for preparation of Development Plan Documents.
Planning and Compulsory Purchase Act S17(3)	2004	The Local Development Documents must, taken as a whole, set out the authority’s policies relating to the development and use of land in their area.	Provides framework for spatial planning strategy in area and against which planning applications are determined.
Planning and Compulsory Purchase Act S17(6)	2004	Keep their Local Development Documents under review (having regard to the results of any review carried out under s.13PCPA).	Ensures spatial Planning framework is up to date.
Planning and Compulsory Purchase Act S24	2004	Local Development Documents must be in general conformity with the regional spatial strategy	N/A
Planning and Compulsory Purchase Act S16	2004	Prepare and maintain a development scheme in relation to minerals and waste (these being the matters in relation to which they still have planning obligations).	Public document setting out timetable for preparation of Minerals and Waste Development Plan Documents. To ensure that waste and minerals developments are consistent with Government objectives of sustainable development, to ensure the adequate and steady supply of minerals to meet the needs of the economy and society, and to ensure sufficient opportunities for the provision of waste management facilities to meet the needs of the community.
Planning and Compulsory Purchase Act S17(4)	2004	Where a county council is required to prepare such a scheme, the council’s Local Development Documents must, taken as a whole, set out the council’s policies relating to development which is a council matter.	Provides framework for spatial planning strategy in area and against which planning applications are determined.
Planning and Compulsory Purchase Act S17(6)	2004	The council must keep their Local Development Documents under review (having regard to the results of any review carried out under s. 14 PCPA)	Ensures Minerals and Waste spatial Planning framework is up to date.
Planning and Compulsory Purchase Act S18	2004	Prepare a statement of community involvement	Public document setting out minimum level of engagement with local community an LPA is committed to.
Planning and Compulsory Purchase Act S20	2004	Local planning authorities must submit every Development Plan Document for independent examination by a person appointed by the Secretary of State	Delivers independent ratification that plans are sound. Provides community with opportunity to make representations to independent examination.
Planning and Compulsory Purchase Act S26	2004	If the Secretary of State so directs, a local planning authority must prepare a revision of any Local Development Document, which is then subject to the examination process again.	Allows Secretary of State to Intervene where Local Planning Authorities not conforming to national policy.
Planning and Compulsory Purchase Act S35	2004	Every local planning authority must make an annual report to the Secretary of State giving such information as is prescribed in relation to the extent of its implementation of the Local Development Scheme, and the extent to which the policies set out in the Local Development Documents are being achieved.	Reports progress on preparation of Development Plan Documents and effectiveness of policies.
Planning and Compulsory Purchase Act Section 38(6)	2004	Local Planning Authorities to decide planning applications in accordance with development plan unless material considerations indicate otherwise.	Ensures Planning applications are determined according to pre determined statements of policy which are justified.
Planning and Compulsory Purchase Act Section 39(2)	2004	Local Planning Authorities to exercise functions under Part 2 with the objective of contributing to the achievement of sustainable development (and subsidiary duty to have regard to connected guidance).	Ensures Local Planning Authorities conforms to current national policy in plan preparation.
Planning and Compulsory Purchase Act Section 19	2004	Preparation of local development documents	Plans must be prepared in accordance with the Local Planning Authorities Local Development Schemes, national policies and guidance, Other statutory plans in effect for the area - eg/Regional Spatial Strategies
Planning and Compulsory Purchase Act Section 34	2004	Guidance	In preparing local development documents Local authorities must have regard to guidance issued by Secretary of State
Planning and Compulsory Purchase Act Section 22	2004	Withdrawal of local development documents.	After a Development Plan Document has been submitted to the Secretary of State for examination, a local authority may only withdraw the Development Plan Document with the recommendation of the person appointed to carry out the examination or by direction from the Secretary of State
Planning and Compulsory Purchase Act Section 23	2004	Adoption of local development documents	Before adopting a Development Plan Document, Local Planning Authorities must make modifications to it as recommended by the person appointed to conduct the examination. A full council resolution is required for the adoption of the Development Plan Document.

=== Other department duties ===
In 2011, there were 1120 legislative duties of local authorities for which other government departments are responsible.

== See also ==
- UK constitutional law
