= Commonwealth Secretariat =

Central agency and central institution of the Commonwealth of Nations

- Logo
- Formation: 1965; 61 years ago
- Purpose: Primary organ of the Commonwealth of Nations
- Headquarters: Marlborough House; London, SW1
- Secretary-General: Shirley Ayorkor Botchwey (2025–present)
- Parent organisation: The Head of the Commonwealth and The Commonwealth Heads of Government Meeting (CHOGM)
- Website: www.thecommonwealth.org

The Commonwealth Secretariat is the main intergovernmental agency and central institution of the Commonwealth of Nations. It is responsible for facilitating co-operation between members; organising meetings, including the Commonwealth Heads of Government Meetings (CHOGM); assisting and advising on policy development; and providing assistance to countries in implementing the decisions and policies of the Commonwealth.

The Secretariat has observer status in the United Nations General Assembly. It is located at Marlborough House in London, the United Kingdom, a former royal residence that was given by Queen Elizabeth II, Head of the Commonwealth at the time. Today, the Head of the Commonwealth is King Charles III.

== History ==
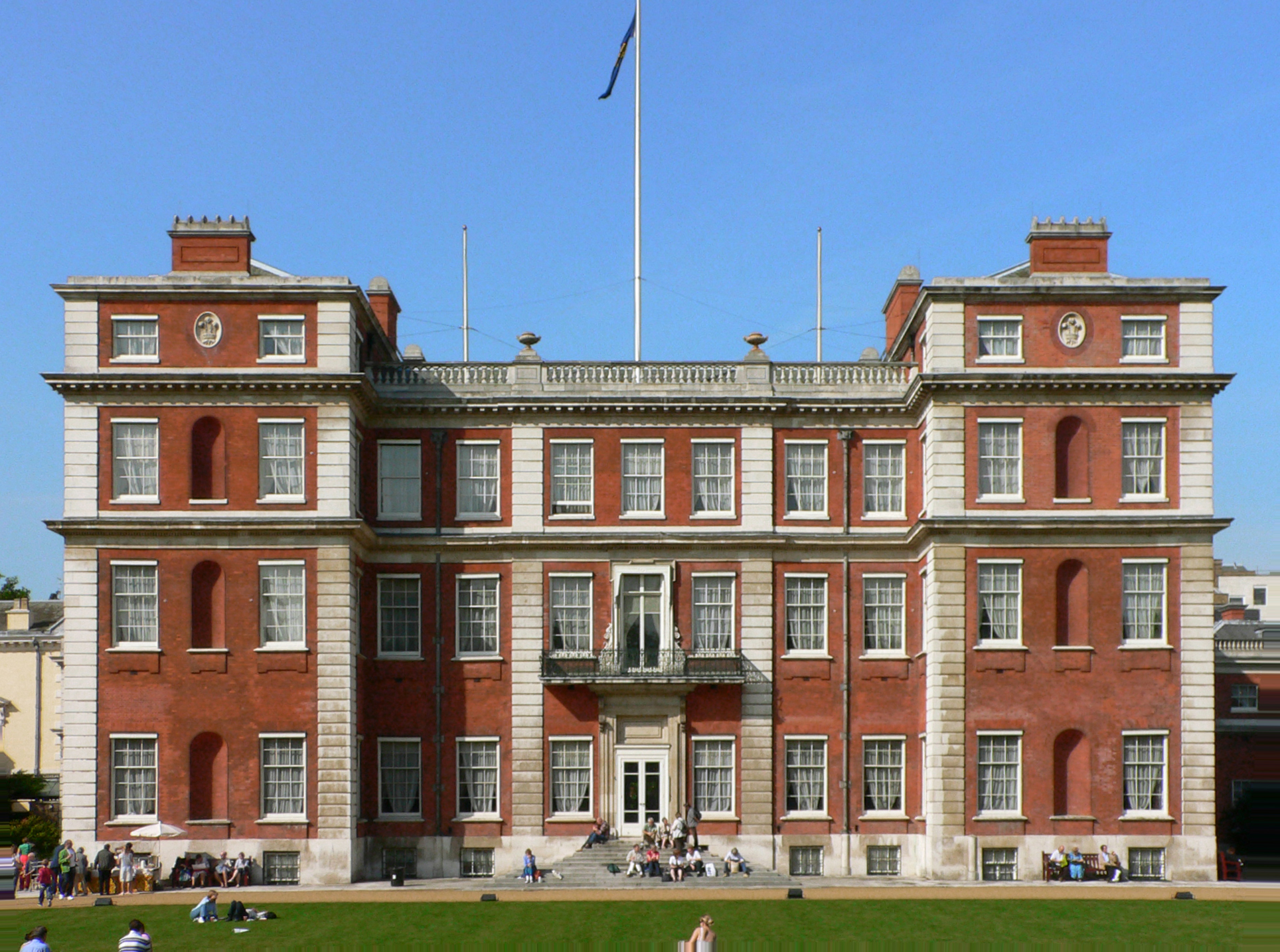
Marlborough House, London, the headquarters of the Commonwealth Secretariat, the Commonwealth's principal intergovernmental institution

The Secretariat was established by the Heads of Government in 1965, taking over many of the functions of the United Kingdom Government's Commonwealth Relations Office, as part of a major shake-up of the organisation of the Commonwealth. The purpose of the Secretariat was to serve as an "information exchange" for the Commonwealth prime ministers. At the same time, the United Kingdom succeeded in advocating the creation of the Secretariat's sister organisation, the Commonwealth Foundation, which was founded to foster non-governmental relations and the promotion of the Commonwealth Family network of civil societies. Other attempts by members to create similar central bodies, such as a medical conference (proposed by New Zealand), a development bank (Jamaica), and an institution for satellite communications (Canada) failed.

The creation of the Secretariat itself was a contentious issue. The United Kingdom and other long-established countries had hoped to slow the expansion of Commonwealth membership to prevent the dilution of their traditional power within the Commonwealth (particularly after the admission of Cyprus). The newer members of the Commonwealth wanted to reduce British power and influence, so formed the Secretariat which would be operated and financed by members from all Commonwealth countries. By diversifying the staff who worked in the Commonwealth, different points of view and perspectives would be seen. This may have involved a dual-tiered Commonwealth, requiring the continuation of the organisation of Commonwealth co-operation by meetings, rather than a central administration. However, the new African members were keener to create an independent inter-governmental "central clearing house" (as Ghana's Kwame Nkrumah described it) to remove power from the older dominions. Milton Obote of Uganda was the first to propose a specifically titled "secretariat", which was then formally proposed by Eric Williams of Trinidad and Tobago, who wished to see it based upon the secretariats of the OAS, EEC, and OAU.

Earlier attempts at the formation of a central secretariat had failed. Australia had proposed the establishment four times (in 1907, 1924, 1932, and 1944), whilst New Zealand had also made proposals in 1909 and 1956. Finally, in July 1964, the Commonwealth Prime Ministers met in London to discuss the establishment of an independent secretariat for the Commonwealth. Many of these members agreed and were unopposed to this idea as they believed this Secretariat would help centralize and broaden the Commonwealth for all members, not solely on Britain.

=== The Rhodesian Crisis ===
Arnold Smith, a Canadian Diplomat, was the first Commonwealth Secretary-General with Amishadai Larson Adu (A. L. Adu) of Ghana and Tilak Gooneratne of Ceylon as the first deputy secretaries-general. In 1965, the Rhodesian Declaration of Independence was issued, gaining its sovereignty from the British in Southern Africa. Simultaneously, Smith was performing his first official visit as Secretary General to East and Central Africa. Due to his diplomatic peacemaking abilities, he was able to save the Commonwealth from dissolving due to clashing opinions. As a result, the prime ministers of the Commonwealth formed a sanctions committee that taught prime ministers how the sanctions they implemented on the "illegal" Salisbury regime were maintained, and a standing committee primarily focused on assisting to train Rhodesian Africans. More state crises occurred after, shifting the Secretariat's dominant focus to peacemaking efforts. The Rhodesian Crisis proved the Commonwealth Secretariat's competence and credibility as their professional diplomat skills allowed them to respond to crises immediately and efficiently.

== Staff ==
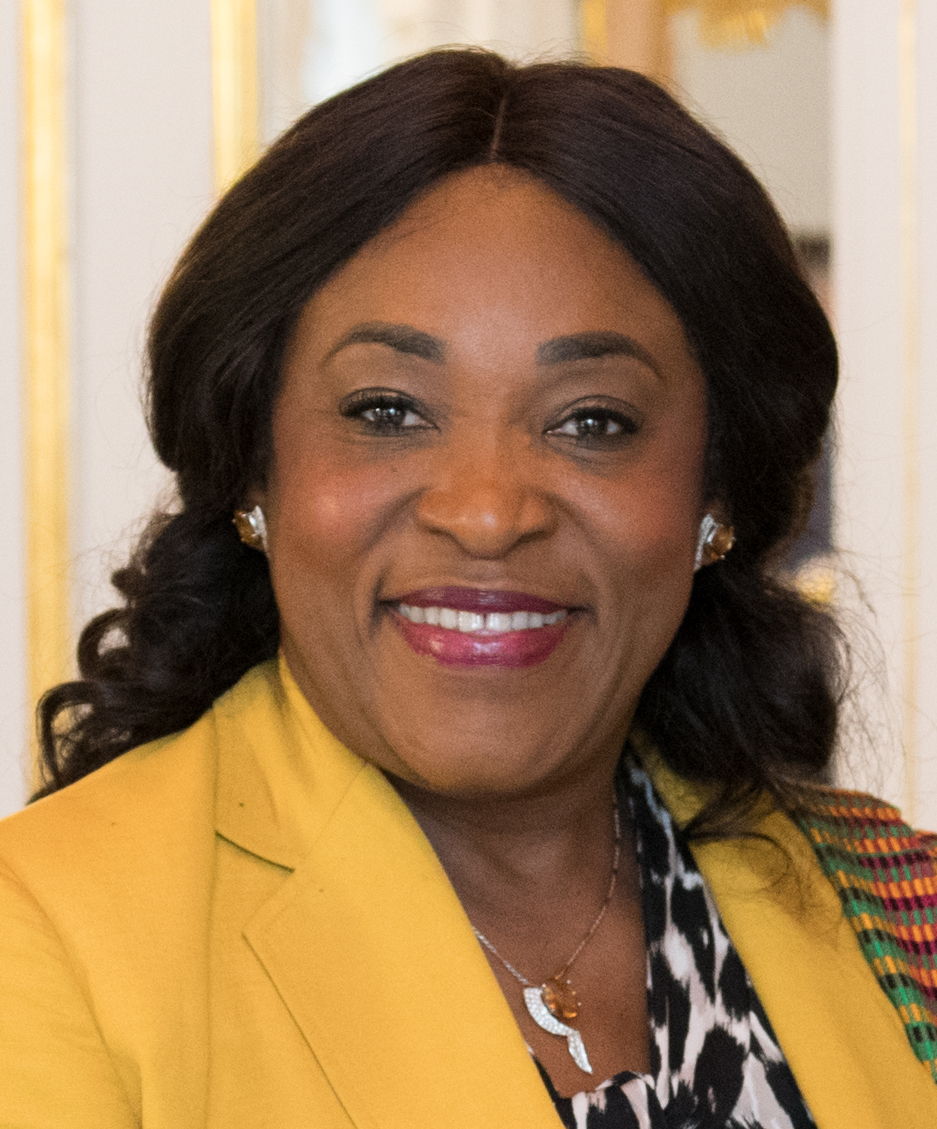
Shirley Ayorkor Botchwey, the current Commonwealth Secretary General since 2025

The chief executive of the Secretariat, and of the Commonwealth as a whole, is the Commonwealth Secretary-General. All Secretariat staff report to the secretary-general, who is also responsible for spending the Secretariat's budget, which is granted by the Heads of Government. It is the secretary-general, and not the ceremonial Head of the Commonwealth, that represents the Commonwealth publicly. The Head of the Commonwealth is more of a symbolic role, chosen by the Commonwealth leaders with no maximum set term. The secretary-general is elected by the Heads of Government at the Commonwealth Heads of Government meetings for a maximum of two terms of four years; until 2000, a term was five years. The current Secretary-General is Ghana's Shirley Ayorkor Botchwey, who replaced Patricia Scotland as secretary-general on 1 April 2025.

The secretary-general is assisted by three deputy secretaries-general: one responsible for economic affairs (currently Deodat Maharaj), one for political affairs (Josephine Ojiambo), and one for corporate affairs (Gary Dunn). The secretary-general may appoint junior staff at his own discretion, provided the Secretariat can afford it, whilst the more senior staff may be appointed only from a shortlist of nominations from the Heads of Government. In practice, the secretary-general has more power than this; member governments consult the secretary-general on nominations, and secretaries-general have also at times submitted nominations of their own.

The Commonwealth Chair-in-Office is responsible for the representing the Commonwealth at "high-level international meetings and reinforces the Good Offices role of the Commonwealth Secretary-General." The "Good Offices" primarily focus on conflict resolution for the Commonwealth. The Current Commonwealth Chair-in-Office is the Samoan Prime Minister Fiamē Naomi Mataʻafa who is responsible for hosting the Commonwealth Heads of Government Meeting (CHOGM). This role has a 2-year term limit which begins before the start of the CHOGM.

All members of staff are exempt from income tax, under the International Organisations Act 2005, which redefined the legal status of the Secretariat.

== Headquarters ==
The Secretariat is headquartered at Marlborough House, in London, the United Kingdom. Marlborough House is located on Pall Mall, Westminster, next to St. James's Palace, which is formally the location of the British Royal Court. Marlborough House was previously a royal residence in its own right, but was given by Queen Elizabeth II, the former Head of the Commonwealth, to the British government in September 1959 for use for Commonwealth purposes. This was first realised three years later. Another three years later, in 1965, the building passed to the Secretariat upon its foundation. The building itself was designed by Sir Christopher Wren and served as the London residence of the dukes of Marlborough until it was given to Princess Charlotte in 1817.

The Commonwealth Secretariat Act 1966, which applied retroactively from the establishment of the Secretariat in 1965, first granted the organisation full diplomatic immunity. This has been subjected to a number of lawsuits challenging this, including Mohsin v Commonwealth Secretariat, and in 2005, Sumukan Limited v Commonwealth Secretariat. The 1966 Act had been interpreted by English courts as allowing the courts to exercise supervisory jurisdiction under the Arbitration Act 1996 over the Commonwealth's arbitration tribunal, which had been envisaged as the sole organ to arbitrate on matters related to the Secretariat's operations in the United Kingdom. In light of this interpretation, the Commonwealth Secretariat Act was amended by the International Organisations Act 2005, which gave the Commonwealth Secretariat Arbitral Tribunal the same legal immunity as the Secretariat itself, guaranteeing independence of the English courts.

== Membership ==
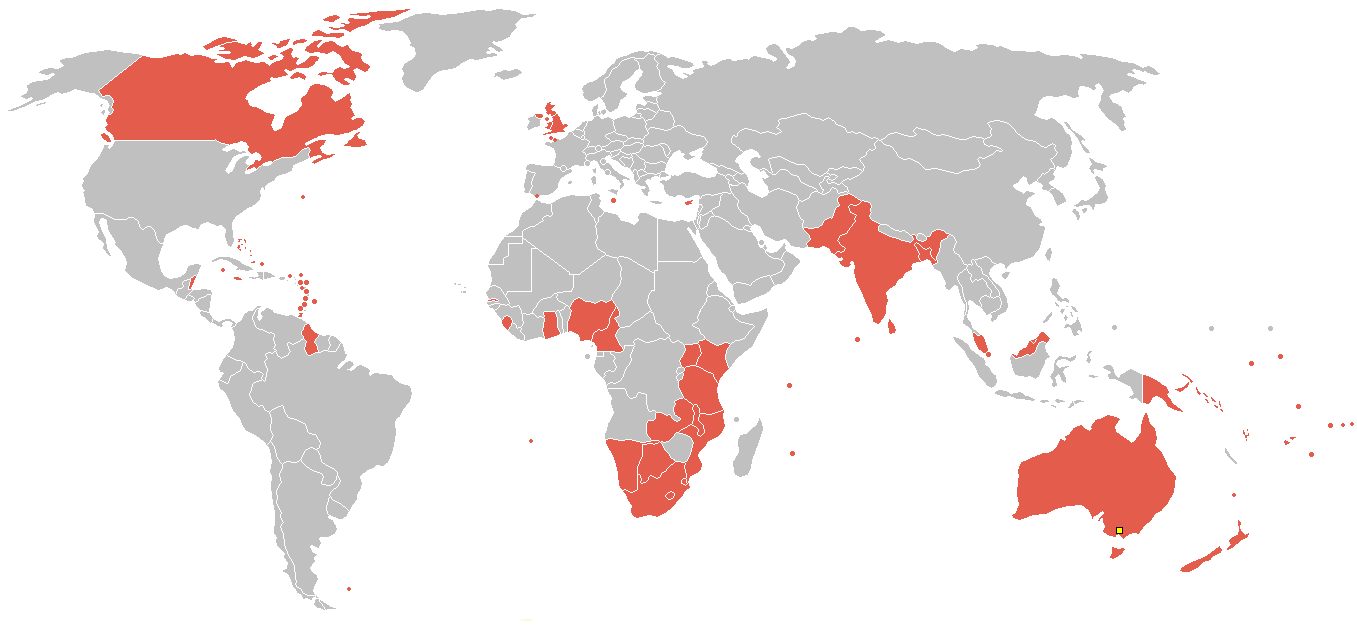
The Member Countries of the Commonwealth

The Commonwealth Secretariat comprises 56 independent countries, 33 small states (states with a population of 1.5 million or less), and 2.7 billion citizens. As of November 2007, when the Commonwealth Heads of Government held a meeting in Uganda, they reviewed and solidified the rules for membership into the Secretariat. The Commonwealth Secretariat outlines these membership rules:

1. The applicant country should have had a past constitutional association with an existing Commonwealth member.
2. Applications will be considered on a case-by-case basis, except in save for exceptional circumstances.
3. The applicant country is expected to abide by the fundamental values written out in the 1971 Declaration of Commonwealth Principles
4. The applicant country should show commitment to democracy and its processes, such as "free and fair elections and representative legislatures; the rule of law and independence of the judiciary; good governance, including a well-trained public service and transparent public accounts; and protection of human rights, freedom of expression, and equality of opportunity."
5. The applicant country should embrace the Commonwealth norms and agreements, such as "the use of the English language as the medium of inter-Commonwealth relations, and acknowledge His Majesty King Charles III as the Head of the Commonwealth."
6. Lastly, newly admitted members are encouraged to join the Commonwealth Foundation and to advance strong civil society and business organizations within their respective countries, and promoting democratic practices.

Any country can join the Commonwealth Secretariat. Gabon and Togo were the most recent states to join in 2022.

=== Member States ===
==== Africa ====
- 🇧🇼 Botswana
- 🇨🇲 Cameroon
- 🇬🇦 Gabon
- 🇬🇲 Gambia, The
- 🇬🇭 Ghana
- 🇰🇪 Kenya
- 🇸🇿 Kingdom of Eswatini
- 🇱🇸 Lesotho
- 🇲🇼 Malawi
- 🇲🇺 Mauritius
- 🇲🇿 Mozambique
- 🇳🇦 Namibia
- 🇳🇬 Nigeria
- 🇷🇼 Rwanda
- 🇸🇨 Seychelles
- 🇸🇱 Sierra Leone
- 🇿🇦 South Africa
- 🇹🇬 Togo
- 🇺🇬 Uganda
- 🇹🇿 United Republic of Tanzania
- 🇿🇲 Zambia

==== Asia ====
- 🇧🇩 Bangladesh
- 🇧🇳 Brunei Darussalam
- 🇮🇳 India
- 🇲🇾 Malaysia
- 🇲🇻 Maldives
- 🇵🇰 Pakistan
- 🇸🇬 Singapore
- 🇱🇰 Sri Lanka

==== Caribbean and Americas ====
- 🇦🇬 Antigua and Barbuda
- 🇧🇸 Bahamas, The
- 🇧🇧 Barbados
- 🇧🇿 Belize
- 🇨🇦 Canada
- 🇩🇲 Dominica
- 🇬🇩 Grenada
- 🇬🇾 Guyana
- 🇯🇲 Jamaica
- 🇱🇨 Saint Lucia
- 🇰🇳 St Kitts and Nevis
- 🇻🇨 St Vincent and the Grenadines
- 🇹🇹 Trinidad and Tobago

==== Europe ====
- 🇨🇾 Cyprus
- 🇲🇹 Malta
- 🇬🇧 United Kingdom

==== Pacific ====
- 🇦🇺 Australia
- 🇫🇯 Fiji
- 🇰🇮 Kiribati
- 🇳🇷 Nauru
- 🇳🇿 New Zealand
- 🇵🇬 Papua New Guinea
- 🇼🇸 Samoa
- 🇸🇧 Solomon Islands
- 🇹🇴 Tonga
- 🇹🇻 Tuvalu
- 🇻🇺 Vanuatu

=== Vision ===
The Commonwealth Secretariat aids in building and maintaining the Commonwealth where all member states are "mutually respectful, resilient, peaceful and prosperous" and values equality and diversity.

=== Mission ===
The Commonwealth Secretariat strives to support their member states and their governments through working with other Commonwealth states and globally promoting their shared values to benefit and improve the well-being of all individuals in the Commonwealth.

== Goals ==
=== Environment ===
The Secretariat focuses on protecting Commonwealth states and their environment by promoting sustainable practices for natural resources. The Commonwealth Climate Change Programme provides support and plans for member states to utilize in order to lessen the impacts of climate change and adapt to changing conditions. This program helps to facilitate an understanding and overview of the capacity member states have to meet their Paris Agreement commitments. Many different partnerships and procedures have been created to lend support to member states in tackling climate change such as the Commonwealth Finance Access Hub, CommonSensing, the Commonwealth Call to Action on Living Lands (CALL), the Commonwealth NDC Programme, the Gender Integration for Climate Action, and the Disaster Risk Finance Portal.

=== Trade and Economy ===
The Secretariat also strives to promote international trade between member states to aid in creating inclusive and sustainable economies, with a particular focus for the Commonwealth's developed and developing countries. Their different programmes such as the Connectivity Agenda, Public Debt Management Programme, and Commonwealth Fintech Toolkit all help in improving global trade competitiveness, managing debt, and promoting sustainable methods for natural resources.

=== Democracy, Government, and Rule of Law ===
The Secretariat develops programmes to encourage democratic practices, good governance strategies, peace, and the rule of law. For example, many of these programmes include countering violent extremism, the promotion and protection of Human Rights, the Commonwealth Cyber Declaration Programme, and the Commonwealth Database on International Cooperation in Criminal Matters.

=== Society ===
The Secretariat emphasizes a focus for the younger generation in enhancing their potential through sports, universal healthcare, gender equality, education, and peacebuilding. These youth focused programs are meant to nurture growing generations into creating resilient and harmonic societies for the future. Commonwealth says NO MORE, Commonwealth Moves, and the Commonwealth Alliance for Quality Youth Leadership are a few examples of the efforts the Commonwealth has taken to implement change and development for society and young people.

=== Small States ===
The Secretariat aims to help its 33 small states by offering specialized support and aid to help improve their development challenges, such as dependence on trade, climate change, natural disasters, and limited access to funds. The Secretariat works toward this goal by advocating for international policies to include and consider small states' needs, aiding in building economic resilience, providing access to financing, and developing publications and reports that can help to create solutions for small states.

== See also ==
- Commonwealth Foundation
- Commonwealth Youth Programme
