= Unauthorised Entry to Football Matches Act 2026 =

Act of the Parliament of the United Kingdom

Unauthorised Entry to Football Matches Act 2026 (Note: Section 2(3).)
- Act of Parliament
- Parliament of the United Kingdom
- Long title: An Act to create an offence of unauthorised entry at football matches for which a football banning order can be imposed following conviction.
- Citation: 2026 c. 1
- Introduced by: Linsey Farnsworth (Commons); Kevin, Lord Brennan of Canton (Lords)
- Territorial extent: England and Wales (Note: Section 2(1).)

Dates
- Royal assent: 22 January 2026
- Commencement: 22 March 2026 (Note: Section 2(2). The Unauthorised Entry to Football Matches Act 2026 (Commencement) Regulations 2026.)
Other legislation
Amends	Football (Offences) Act 1991

Status: Current legislation

Text of statute as originally enacted

Revised text of statute as amended

The Unauthorised Entry to Football Matches Act 2026 (c. 1) is an act of the Parliament of the United Kingdom which created the offence of unauthorised entry to designated football matches of elite games where those found guilty may be given a Football Banning Order. It was a Private Members' Bill, sponsored by Labour MP Linsey Farnsworth and sponsored in the House of Lords by Kevin, Lord Brennan of Canton.

The act received royal assent on 22 January 2026 and came into force in March of that year.

== Provisions ==
=== Commencement ===
Unauthorised Entry to Football Matches Act 2026 (Commencement) Regulations 2026 (Note: Section 1.)
- Statutory Instrument
- Parliament of the United Kingdom
- Citation: SI 2026/288
- Introduced by: Sarah Jones MP (Commons)
- Territorial extent: England and Wales

Dates
- Made: 12th March 2026
- Commencement: 22 March 2026
Other legislation
Made under	Unauthorised Entry to Football Matches Act 2026

Status: Current legislation

Text of statute as originally enacted

The Unauthorised Entry to Football Matches Act 2026 (Commencement) Regulations 2026 (SI 2026/288) provided that act would come into force on 22 March.
