= Electoral Registration (Northern Ireland) Act 2005 =

Act of the Parliament of the United Kingdom

Electoral Registration (Northern Ireland) Act 2005 (Note: Section 4(2).)
- Act of Parliament
- Parliament of the United Kingdom
- Long title: An Act to make provision about the registration of electors in Northern Ireland in cases where required information is not provided.
- Citation: 2005 c. 1
- Introduced by: Baroness Amos, Lord President of the Council (Lords)
- Territorial extent: Northern Ireland (Note: Section 4(3).)

Dates
- Royal assent: 24 February 2005
- Commencement: 24 February 2005 (Note: Section 4(b) of the Interpretation Act 1978.)
- Expired: 24 February 2006 (Note: Section 3(1).)

Status: Expired

Text of statute as originally enacted

Revised text of statute as amended

The Electoral Registration (Northern Ireland) Act 2005 (c. 1) was an act of the Parliament of the United Kingdom. It expired on 24 February 2006.

== Background ==
Baroness Amos said that the bill for this act was introduced because the government was concerned that only 85% of those eligible to vote in Northern Ireland were included in the electoral register (compared to 93% in Great Britain).

The last annual canvas before the 2005 act was introduced had been in September 2004.

== Parliamentary debates ==
The House of Lords considered the legislation in the following manner:

First Reading	9 February 2005
Second Reading	21 February 2005
Committee and Report	22 February 2005
Third Reading	22 February 2005

The bill received its Second and Third Reading in the House of Commons on 24 February 2005.

== Provisions ==
The act authorised the Chief Electoral Officer of Northern Ireland to re-register several thousand voters removed from the electoral register under the Electoral Fraud (Northern Ireland) Act 2002.

== Bibliography ==
- "Electoral Registration (Northern Ireland) Act 2005". Current Law Statutes Annotated 2005. Sweet & Maxwell. London. W Green. Edinburgh. 2005. Volume 1. Chapter 1. pp 1-1 to 1-4.
- Halsbury's Statutes,
