= Sumukan Ltd v Commonwealth Secretariat =

UK legal case

Sumukan Ltd v Commonwealth Secretariat concerned a dispute over the ownership of software developed by Sumukan Ltd, a London-based technology company, in connection with a demonstration project funded by the Commonwealth Secretariat. The litigation raised questions of contractual interpretation, intellectual property ownership, the scope of immunity granted to international organisations under the Commonwealth Secretariat Act 1965, and the right of access to a court under Article 6 of the European Convention on Human Rights.

The dispute was first determined in 2005 by the Secretariat’s internal tribunal, which concluded that the Secretariat owned the software used in the demonstration. Sumukan Ltd subsequently brought proceedings in the Commercial Court of England and Wales. In 2007, the High Court (Colman J) held that, although the tribunal’s reasoning was “open to serious doubt”, the court lacked jurisdiction to intervene because the Secretariat enjoyed statutory immunity and its internal rules provided no right of appeal. Further proceedings in the Court of Appeal resulted in a finding that defects in the appointment of an arbitrator rendered the arbitral award a nullity.

== Background ==
Sumukan Ltd entered into an agreement with the Commonwealth Secretariat to demonstrate its auction and online tender software to the Government of Namibia as part of a development initiative. The agreement provided for a fee of £15,000. According to Sumukan Ltd, ownership of the underlying software toolkit and related intellectual property was not transferred as part of the arrangement, and any broader licensing would require separate negotiation.

After changes in personnel within the Secretariat, disagreement emerged. Issues were raised regarding unpaid fees and expenses, and more fundamentally, as to who owned the software and toolkit used during the demonstration. Sumukan Ltd maintained that no assignment of its intellectual property had occurred. The Secretariat took the opposite view, asserting ownership of the software deployed in the project.

Because the Commonwealth Secretariat is an international organisation protected by statutory immunity under the Commonwealth Secretariat Act 1965, the dispute was initially addressed through the Secretariat’s internal tribunal rather than the domestic courts.

== Internal tribunal ==
On 21 February 2005, a three-member panel of the Secretariat’s internal tribunal held that the Secretariat owned the software used in the demonstration. Sumukan Ltd challenged that determination, contending that the tribunal lacked sufficient independence and that the decision amounted to an unlawful deprivation of its property.

== Commercial Court proceedings ==
Proceedings were commenced in the Commercial Court challenging both the tribunal’s determination and the effect of the Secretariat’s immunity. The case was heard by Mr Justice Colman.

Sumukan Ltd argued that the tribunal had erred in its treatment of the contractual and intellectual property issues. It further contended that the absence of any right of appeal to the English courts, when combined with the Secretariat’s statutory immunity, infringed its right to a fair hearing under Article 6 of the European Convention on Human Rights. The company also relied on Article 1 of Protocol 1, asserting interference with its right to peaceful enjoyment of its possessions.

Colman J observed that the tribunal’s reasoning was “open to serious doubt”. Nonetheless, he concluded that the court had no substantive jurisdiction. Parliament had granted the Secretariat immunity in clear terms, and the organisation’s internal rules excluded recourse to the English courts. Although the access-to-justice arguments were acknowledged to be serious, the statutory framework was decisive. Permission to appeal was granted on the jurisdictional issue alone.

== Court of Appeal ==
The Court of Appeal (Civil Division) subsequently considered issues concerning the validity of the arbitral process and the effect of the exclusion agreement. It held that a failure to comply with the proper procedure for appointing an arbitrator invalidated the arbitration and rendered the resulting award a nullity.

== Significance ==
The case is frequently cited in discussions concerning the interaction between institutional immunity and access to justice. It illustrates the limits of judicial scrutiny where Parliament has conferred immunity on an international organisation, even in circumstances where a court expresses reservations about the reasoning of an internal tribunal.

The Court of Appeal’s decision also underscores the importance of procedural regularity in arbitral and quasi-arbitral processes, particularly where immunity restricts recourse to the ordinary courts.

== See also ==
- Mohsin v Commonwealth Secretariat
- Sovereign immunity
- Article 6 of the European Convention on Human Rights
