= Terrorism (Protection of Premises) Act 2025 =

Act of the Parliament of the United Kingdom

Terrorism (Protection of Premises) Act 2025 (Note: Section 38.)
- Act of Parliament
- Parliament of the United Kingdom
- Long title: An Act to require persons with control of certain premises or events to take steps to reduce the vulnerability of the premises or event to, and the risk of physical harm to individuals arising from, acts of terrorism; to confer related functions on the Security Industry Authority; to limit the disclosure of information about licensed premises that is likely to be useful to a person committing or preparing an act of terrorism; and for connected purposes.
- Citation: 2025 c. 10
- Introduced by: Yvette Cooper, Home Secretary (Commons); Lord Hanson of Flint, Minister of State at the Home Office (Lords)
- Territorial extent: England and Wales; Scotland; Northern Ireland; (Note: Section 36.)

Dates
- Royal assent: 3 April 2025
- Commencement: 3 April 2025 (part 3); 10 April 2026 (section 27) (Note: The Terrorism (Protection of Premises) Act 2025 (Commencement No. 1) Regulations 2026 (SI 2026/320).); (Note: Section 37.)
Other legislation
Amends	Private Security Industry Act 2001; Licensing Act 2003; Licensing (Scotland) Act 2005

Status: Current legislation

History of passage through Parliament

Text of statute as originally enacted

Revised text of statute as amended

The Terrorism (Protection of Premises) Act 2025 (c. 10), also known as Martyn's Law, is an act of the Parliament of the United Kingdom introduced in response to the 2017 Manchester Arena bombing. It requires venues hosting large events (over 200 participants) to make plans and train staff for their response to any potential terrorist attacks.

The act is known as Martyn's law, in honour of Martyn Hett, one of the victims of the terrorist attack, whose mother campaigned for more stringent laws to protect members of the public. The legislation makes it a legal requirement for premises and events to comply with a number of measures, with these differing depending on how many members of public the premises or event is expected to host. The Security Industry Authority is responsible for regulating compliance.

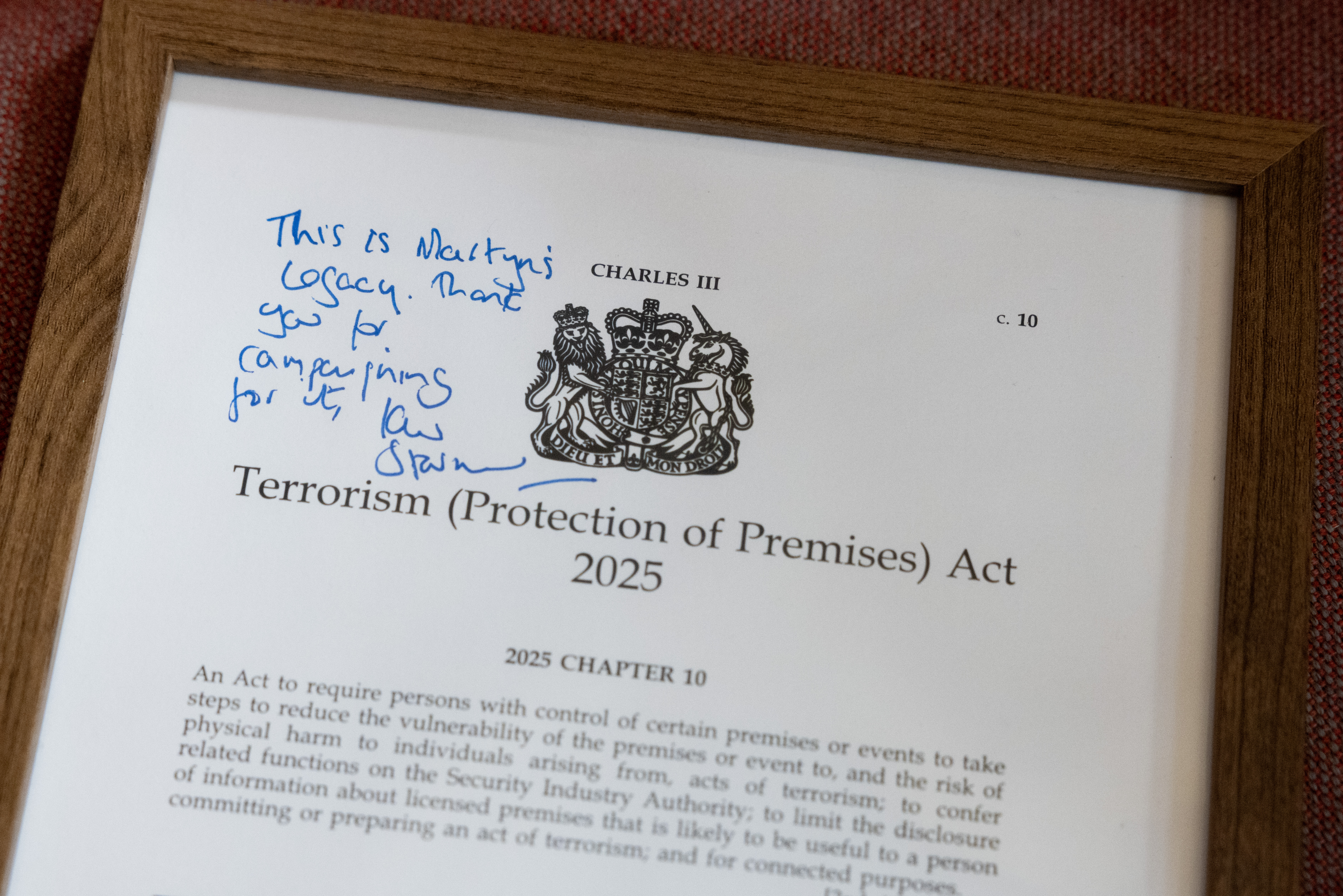
A framed copy of the act signed by Sir Keir Starmer

== Background ==
In May 2017, 22 people were killed as a result of the Manchester Arena bombing, when attending an Ariana Grande concert, in a terrorist attack committed by Salman Abedi. Martyn Hett, by whose name the legislation is known, was one of the people killed in the bombing, and his mother Figen Murray campaigned for the law to be introduced, having initially created a petition which was signed by 23,000 people, in 2019.

Legislation was included in the King's speech at the 2023 State Opening of Parliament. Martyn Hett's mother walked 200 miles to London in May 2024 to meet the then prime minister, Rishi Sunak, and reported that he "promised her he would introduce Martyn's Law to Parliament before the summer recess, but could not guarantee it would be passed before the next election"; hours later he called a general election, bringing a halt to parliamentary business. It had not been introduced by the time Parliament was suspended for the 2024 general election.

== Parliamentary passage ==
The bill was included in the King's Speech at the 2024 State Opening of Parliament. It was introduced to Parliament on 12 September 2024 and had its second reading on 14 October 2024. It had its third reading in the House of Commons on 9 December 2024, and its third reading in the House of Lords on 11 March 2025, and received royal assent on 3 April 2025.

== Provisions ==
Four criteria need to be met for a premises to fall within the legislation's requirements: there must always be a building/buildings on the site (that are accessible to the public), the premises must be wholly or mainly used for specified purposes (with a broad range of purposes detailed in schedule 1), 200 or more people must be expected to be present on a single occasion (from time to time), and the premises must not be excluded (due to schedule 2). There are also criteria that must be met for an event to fall within the scope of the legislation.

The legislation creates two tiers of requirements, based on the capacity, the first being referred to as the "standard tier", for premises that hold between 200-799 people, and the second being called the "enhanced tier", for premises and events that have a capacity of 800 or over. The standard tier must have adequately trained staff, and established evacuation and lock down procedures, whilst the enhanced tier must document their plans and measures, undertake bag searches and have CCTV.

The legislation stipulates that the Security Industry Authority must carry out regulatory functions in respect of the legislation, and a responsible person must notify the authority of qualifying premises and events, with a notification portal created for this purpose. Procedures and measures the venues have taken must also be shared with the regulator, within the enhanced tier.

In accordance with section 27 of the act, the Home Office published guidance on 15 April 2026, and on the same date the Security Industry Authority launched a public consultation on the authority's draft guidelines, in accordance with section 12. The Home Office guidance suggests that specialist consultancy services should not be necessary for compliance to be achieved.
