= List of statutory instruments of the United Kingdom, 2026 =

This is an incomplete list of statutory instruments of the United Kingdom in 2026.

== Statutory instruments ==
Title	Number	Authority
Cosmetic Products Regulation (EC) No 1223/2009 (Restriction of Chemical Substances) (Amendment and Transitional Provisions) Regulations 2026	SI 2026/23	Regulation (EC) No 1223/2009 of the European Parliament and of the Council on cosmetic products
Cumbria Combined Authority Order 2026	SI 2026/158	Local Democracy, Economic Development and Construction Act 2009 Local Audit and Accountability Act 2014
Protection of Military Remains Act 1986 (Designation of Vessels and Controlled Sites) Order 2026	SI 2026/286	Protection of Military Remains Act 1986
Unauthorised Entry to Football Matches Act 2026 (Commencement) Regulations 2026	SI 2026/288	Unauthorised Entry to Football Matches Act 2026
Terrorism (Protection of Premises) Act 2025 (Commencement No. 1) Regulations 2026	SI 2026/320	Terrorism (Protection of Premises) Act 2025
Combined Authorities (Mayoral Elections) (Amendment) Order 2026	SI 2026/652	Local Democracy, Economic Development and Construction Act 2009 Levelling-up and Regeneration Act 2023

== See also ==
- List of statutory instruments of the United Kingdom
