= Regulation of Financial Services (Land Transactions) Act 2005 =

Act of the Parliament of the United Kingdom

Regulation of Financial Services (Land Transactions) Act 2005 (Note: Section 2(1).)
- Act of Parliament
- Parliament of the United Kingdom
- Long title: An Act to enable activities relating to certain arrangements involving the acquisition or disposal of land to be regulated under the Financial Services and Markets Act 2000.
- Citation: 2005 c. 24
- Territorial extent: United Kingdom

Dates
- Royal assent: 19 December 2005
- Commencement: 19 February 2006 (Note: Section 2(2).)
Other legislation
| Amends | Financial Services and Markets Act 2000 |

Status: Current legislation

History of passage through Parliament

Text of statute as originally enacted

Text of the Regulation of Financial Services (Land Transactions) Act 2005 as in force today (including any amendments) within the United Kingdom, from legislation.gov.uk.

The Regulation of Financial Services (Land Transactions) Act 2005 (c. 24) is an act of the Parliament of the United Kingdom.

The purpose of the act is to allow Ijara products and flexible tenure products to be regulated by the Financial Services Authority.

== Background ==
The Labour MP, David Stewart had proposed such a scheme in January 2005 through a private members' bill.

== Provisions ==
The act was designed to provide protections for elderly people in relation to certain kinds of equity release scheme through the Financial Ombudsman.

=== Section 2 – Short title and commencement ===
Section 2(1) authorises the citation of the act by a short title.

Section 2(2) provides that the act came into force at the end of the period of two months that began on the date on which it was passed. The word "months" means calendar months. The day (that is to say, 19 December 2005) on which the act was passed (that is to say, received royal assent) is included in the period of two months. This means that the act came into force on 19 February 2006.
