= International Organisations Act 2005 =

Act of the Parliament of the United Kingdom

International Organisations Act 2005 (Note: Section 11(1).)
- Act of Parliament
- Parliament of the United Kingdom
- Long title: An Act to make provision about privileges, immunities and facilities in connection with certain international organisations.
- Citation: 2005 c. 20
- Territorial extent: United Kingdom (Note: Section 11(4).)

Dates
- Royal assent: 7 April 2005
- Commencement: 7 June 2005 (except sections 1–3); (Note: Section 11(3).); 11 July 2005 (sections 1 and 2) (Note: Section 11(4). The International Organisations Act 2005 (Commencement) Order 2005.); 6 April 2006 (section 3)
Other legislation
Amends	Commonwealth Secretariat Act 1966; International Organisations Act 1968; Arbitration Act 1996; International Criminal Court Act 2001

Status: Current legislation

Text of statute as originally enacted

Revised text of statute as amended

The International Organisations Act 2005 (c. 20) is an act of the Parliament of the United Kingdom. Its purpose is to enable the United Kingdom to fulfil a give certain international organisations legal capacity, certain legal privileges and certain legal immunities.

== Provisions ==
The organisations affected by the act are:

- the Commonwealth Secretariat/Commonwealth Secretariat Arbitral Tribunal
- the Organization for Security and Co-operation in Europe (OSCE)
- bodies established under Titles V and VI of the Treaty on European Union - Provisions on a Common Foreign and Security Policy and on Police and Judicial Cooperation in Criminal Matters
- the International Criminal Court (ICC)
- the European Court of Human Rights (ECHR)
- the International Tribunal for the Law of the Sea (ITLOS)

In relation to the Commonweatlh Secretariat Arbitration Tribunal, the act changed the status of the tribunal so that its proceedings were no longer "arbitration" under the domestic law of the United Kingdom and could therefore be conducted in public.

In relation to the Organization for Security and Co-operation in Europe, the act was broadly in line with the 1993 Rome Council Decision.
