= Commonwealth Secretariat Act 1966 =

Act of the Parliament of the United Kingdom

Commonwealth Secretariat Act 1966 (Note: Section 2(1).)
- Act of Parliament
- Parliament of the United Kingdom
- Long title: An Act to make provision with respect to the Commonwealth Secretariat; and for connected purposes.
- Citation: 1966 c. 10
- Territorial extent: United Kingdom

Dates
- Royal assent: 10 March 1966
- Commencement: 1 July 1965 (Note: Section 2(2).)
Other legislation
Amended by	Social Security Act 1973; Social Security (Consequential Provisions) Act 1975; British Nationality Act 1981; Finance (No. 2) Act 1992; Value Added Tax Act 1994; International Organisations Act 2005; Taxation (Cross-border Trade) Act 2018

Status: Amended

Text of statute as originally enacted

Revised text of statute as amended

Text of the Commonwealth Secretariat Act 1966 as in force today (including any amendments) within the United Kingdom, from legislation.gov.uk.

The Commonwealth Secretariat Act 1966 (c. 10) is an act of the Parliament of the United Kingdom that established the legal character of the Secretariat of the Commonwealth of Nations. The act granted the Secretariat full legal immunity. It was applied retroactively to 1 July 1965, when the Secretariat was constituted.

Until the International Organisations Act 2005, the act did not grant employees of the Secretariat exemption from paying income tax, but this was granted with the passage of the later act.
