= Security Industry Authority =

Statutory body in the United Kingdom

- Founded: 2003
- Type: Non-departmental public body
- Purpose: Regulating the private security industry
- Location: London, United Kingdom
- Region served: United Kingdom
- Method: Compulsory licensing of individuals working in specific sectors of the private security industry; Managing the Approved Contractor Scheme
- Key people: Michelle Russell (Chief Executive); Mike Cunningham (Chair)
- Employees: 369 (2024/25)
- Website: www.gov.uk/sia

The Security Industry Authority (SIA) is the statutory organisation responsible for regulating the private security industry, and public event venues in terms of terrorism protection laws, in the UK. Established as a non-departmental public body in 2003, the SIA reports to the Home Secretary under the terms of the Private Security Industry Act 2001.

Duties of the SIA are to regulate the compulsory licensing of individuals who undertake designated activities within the private security industry, to manage a voluntary Approved Contractor Scheme which measures private security service suppliers against independently established assessment criteria, and to regulate venues to ensure compliance with the Terrorism (Protection of Premises) Act 2025.

== History ==
Before the passage of the 2001 act, the private security industry was unregulated in the United Kingdom.

The British Security Industry Association had been lobbying for a regulatory framework for longer than a decade before the act was passed.

=== Establishment in relation to England and Wales ===
Private Security Industry Act 2001 (Note: Section 26(2).)
- Act of Parliament
- Parliament of the United Kingdom
- Long title: An Act to make provision for the regulation of the private security industry.
- Citation: 2001 c. 12
- Territorial extent: United Kingdom (Note: Section 26(3).)

Dates
- Royal assent: 11 May 2001
- Commencement: Various (Note: Section 26(2).)
Other legislation
Amends	House of Commons Disqualification Act 1975
Amended by	Sentencing Act 2020; Terrorism (Protection of Premises) Act 2025

Status: Amended

Text of statute as originally enacted

Revised text of statute as amended

The Private Security Industry Act 2001 (c. 12) was passed to provide a regulatory framework for the private security industry.

The act was implemented region-by-region, with London being the last region.

=== Extension to Scotland ===
The Serious Organised Crime and Police Act 2005 extended the 2001 act to Scotland.

The Scottish Executive had considered establishing a separate body for Scotland, but had decided that it would be too expensive as a regulatory burden for companies.

=== Extension to Northern Ireland ===
The Private Security Industry Act 2001 (Amendment) (Northern Ireland) Order 2009 extended the 2001 act to Northern Ireland.

Part of the motivation for its extension to Northern Ireland was that the British Government was concerned about the involvement of paramilitaries in the security industry in Northern Ireland.

The Social Democratic and Labour Party was partially supportive of the extension of the regulatory framework to Northern Ireland.

=== History beyond the Private Security Industry Act and extension ===
On 14 October 2010, the UK Government's Cabinet Office made an announcement on the future of many public bodies. Its intention for the SIA was stated as: "Security Industry Authority – No Longer an NDPB – Phased transition to new regulatory regime."

In March 2011 the SIA was removed from Schedule 1 of the Public Bodies Bill (subsequently, the Public Bodies Act 2011).

On 20 November 2012 the Home Office published a consultation document entitled 'Consultation on a Future Regulatory Regime for the Private Security Industry'. The document proposed a regime in which individuals will continue to be licensed but the primary focus of the regulator will shift to a system of business regulation. The future status of the SIA was not considered.

On 11 January 2016 it was announced that a consultation into the future of the SIA was being conducted. Organisations and individuals could submit opinions and experiences.

In February of 2025, it was announced that the SIA had been classified by the Cabinet Office as an Executive Non-Departmental Public Body of the Home Office.

The Terrorism (Protection of Premises) Act 2025, created new regulatory responsibilities for SIA, who will work to ensure that venues and premises are compliant with the requirements.

== SIA licensing ==
One of the main duties of the SIA is the compulsory licensing of individuals working in specific sectors of the private security industry. Whether or not an individual requires a licence is determined by: "the role that is performed" and "the activity that is undertaken". These are described fully in Section 3 and Schedule 2 of the Private Security Industry Act 2001 (as amended). It is a criminal offence to engage in licensable conduct without a licence: if found guilty, the maximum penalty is six months imprisonment and/or an unlimited fine.

=== Licensable activities (sectors) ===
The activities defined as licensable by the Act are:

- Cash and Valuables in Transit (CVIT)
- Close Protection (CP)
- Door Supervision (DS)
- Public Space Surveillance (CCTV)
- Security Guarding (SG)
- Vehicle Immobilisation (VI)
- Key Holding (KH)

The Private Security Industry Act 2001 (as amended) allows for SIA licensing of private investigation activities, security consultants and precognition agents but the SIA does not license these activities. On 1 October 2012 the Protection of Freedoms Act 2012 made it an offence to undertake vehicle immobilisation in England and Wales without lawful authority. The SIA cancelled most of the vehicle immobiliser licences held by individuals in England and Wales. Exceptions were made for those individuals wishing to undertake vehicle immobilisation activities in Northern Ireland (where vehicle immobilisation is still legal) or key holding and non-front line security roles in the United Kingdom (which any SIA licence allows). On 31 July 2013 the Home Secretary announced that the SIA will be regulating private investigators. No deadline was given, although the announcement stated that "The regulation of private investigators will be introduced as quickly as possible and the new regime will begin next year [2014]".

=== Two Types of SIA licence ===
There are two types of SIA licence:

- A front line licence is required if undertaking licensable activity, other than key holding activities (this also covers undertaking non-front line activity). A front line licence is in the form of a credit card-sized plastic card that must be worn, subject to the licence conditions.
- A non-front line licence is required for those who manage, supervise and/or employ individuals who engage in licensable activity, as long as front line activity is not carried out – this includes directors or partners. A non-front line licence is issued in the form of a letter that also covers key holding activities.

=== In-house guarding ===
The Private Security Industry Act 2001 does not require staffed guards employed in-house to be licensed unless their activities are in relation to licensed premises. The SIA was charged by Parliament to investigate the implications of extending the legislation to cover in-house staffed guards once licensing of the private security industry had been in force for three to four years. To meet this obligation the SIA consulted widely through a range of mechanisms. Its assessment of the evidence took into account that regulation should only be targeted where action was needed; that regulation should only intervene where there is a clear case for public protection, and any proposal for further regulation should be proportionate and follow a risk-based approach. Its conclusion was that there was no clearly defined or substantiated risk to public protection to be addressed and that it is unable to make a case which would justify extending its remit to include the licensing of in-house guards.

=== Licence-linked qualifications ===
Individuals applying for a front line SIA licence must prove that they are properly qualified to do their job. If they don't hold one of the SIA-endorsed qualifications then their licence application will be refused. The licence-linked qualifications are intended for individuals entering the private security industry. Their purpose is to ensure that the individual is capable of performing their duties in a manner that will not cause harm to themselves or any member of the public. The qualifications are meant to address the core areas of the role; they are not intended to cover all of the training that an operative could possibly have.

The SIA does not run training courses or award qualifications and does not approve or vet training providers. The SIA specifies the knowledge and skills that a licence holder needs to know and be able to do and these specifications form the basis of the qualifications linked to SIA licensing. The SIA has endorsed certain awarding bodies to offer these qualifications and approve training providers.

In January 2008, Panorama carried out an undercover investigation into the training that candidates were undertaking to obtain their SIA licences. This revealed that mobile phone use and open talking in exams was common practice during the training course and examination that the reporter took. Training malpractice such as this is a matter for the various UK Qualification Regulatory Authorities. Training malpractice can be defined as any deliberate activity, neglect, default or other practice that compromises the integrity of the assessment process and / or the validity of certificates.

Confirmed cases of training malpractice may result in:

- the relevant awarding body or bodies removing the training centre's approval
- the SIA revoking the licences of those licence holders who benefited from the malpractice.

== Approved Contractor Scheme ==
One of the main duties of the SIA is to manage the Approved Contractor Scheme (ACS), a voluntary quality assurance scheme that measures private security suppliers against independently assessed operational and performance standards. Organisations that meet these standards are awarded 'Approved Contractor' status. At the end of March 2012, the total number of approved contractors was 729.

The ACS is based upon widely recognised business improvement models: ISO9001 and the European Foundation for Quality Management (EFQM) Excellence Model. The Scheme also references the British Standard codes of practice applicable to the private security industry and conformance to the relevant codes is built into the ACS requirements.

Companies applying to the scheme are assessed against 89 individual indicators of achievement. The SIA does not normally assess contractors directly, though it may do so in exceptional circumstances. The usual practice is for assessment by one of the SIA's appointed assessing bodies. As of August 2010, these UKAS-accredited assessing bodies are: BSI; Chamber Certification Assessment Services Ltd; NSI (prop. Insight Certification Ltd); ISOQAR; SSAIB.

SIA approval is only available for the activities of an organisation that are regulated under the Private Security Industry Act 2001. Approval is sector-specific, so a company offering two different kinds of private security services may be approved in one but not the other. To maintain approval an approved contractor must re-register every year and renew approval every three years. This process means that approved contractors are independently assessed on an annual basis.

=== ACS scoring ===
The ACS scoring system was not designed to be a differentiation tool. However, it can assist when gauging overall quality, provided that its limitations are understood. It is important that the score is looked at alongside other differentiators (such as the contractor's reputation in the marketplace or the quality of its tender response) and not in isolation.

- Contractors with a score of 56 or higher would be in the top half of performance for approved contractors
- Contractors with a score of 130 or higher would be in the top 5%

=== Falsely claiming approval ===
Claiming to be an approved contractor when this is not the case is an offence under section 16 of the Private Security Industry Act 2001. A section 16 offence includes use of the Approved Contractor Scheme accreditation mark or the use of language that may suggest approval or endorsement, such as "SIA registered" or "SIA member". The penalties for committing an offence under Section 16 are:

- Upon summary conviction at a Magistrate's Court, Sheriff Court or District Court, a fine of up to £5,000.
- Upon conviction on indictment at Crown Court, High Court of Justiciary or Sheriff and jury trial, an unlimited fine.
