= 2024 State Opening of Parliament =

Start of session of UK Parliament

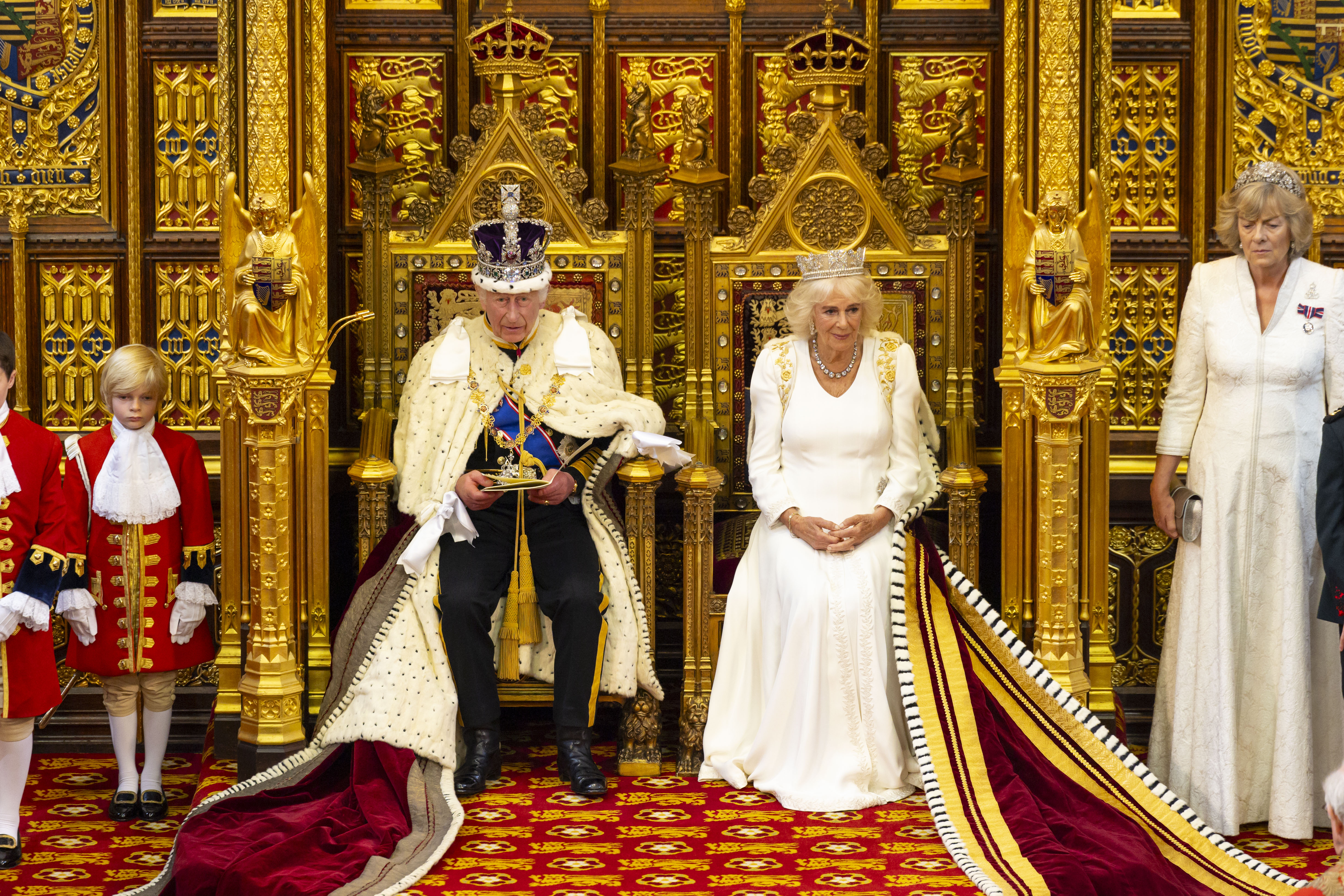
- King Charles III and Queen Camilla sitting in the House of Lords
- Legislative body: Parliament of the United Kingdom
- Meeting place: Palace of Westminster
- Date: 17 July 2024
- Government: Starmer ministry

A State Opening of the Parliament of the United Kingdom took place on 17 July 2024 when King Charles III opened the first session of the Parliament elected in 2024, which was the first after the 2024 general election. Charles III delivered the King's Speech, his second as monarch, (Note: His third overall; Charles also delivered the Queen's Speech at the 2022 State Opening of Parliament as Prince of Wales on behalf of his mother, as a Counsellor of State.) and the first since returning to his public duties after receiving treatment for cancer earlier in the year. The King set out the UK government's legislative programme for the following parliamentary session.

Along with Queen Camilla, Charles III travelled to Westminster in the Diamond Jubilee State Coach and was accompanied by the Household Cavalry. At Westminster, the King read the 1,421 word speech from the throne in the House of Lords. The speech was then debated by both Houses of Parliament. July 2024 marked Keir Starmer's first State Opening of Parliament since becoming UK Prime Minister after the Labour Party won the election earlier that month.

The speech outlined 39 pieces of legislation that Labour intends to introduce in the months ahead, including bills to renationalise the railways, to strengthen the rights of workers, tackle illegal immigration, reform the House of Lords, and undertake a programme to speed up the delivery of "high quality infrastructure" and housing.

== Background ==
On 30 May 2024, and following the announcement of the 2024 general election, it was announced that there would be a State Opening of Parliament on 17 July. The election, held on 4 July, was won by the Labour Party, which defeated the incumbent Conservative government after 14 years in office, securing a landslide victory, with Sir Keir Starmer becoming prime minister. The preceding government's tenure had seen high inflation, political scandals and an economic crisis, and Starmer's election campaign had focussed on improving the UK's economy and infrastructure while not raising personal taxes. He was keen to change the direction of the country with a raft of new legislation.

It was Charles III's second State Opening of Parliament since his accession to the throne in September 2022, and his first since returning to his public duties after being diagnosed with cancer in February 2024, and subsequently receiving treatment for the illness. Although the King had stepped back from his public duties for a time, he had continued with his constitutional role, such as private meetings, including those with the prime minister, and paperwork.

On the morning of the State Opening, the Metropolitan Police arrested 10 members of the protest group Youth Demand after the organisation stated its intention to disrupt proceedings over Keir Starmer's handling of the Gaza war. The individuals were detained on suspicion of conspiracy to cause public nuisance.

== Ceremony ==
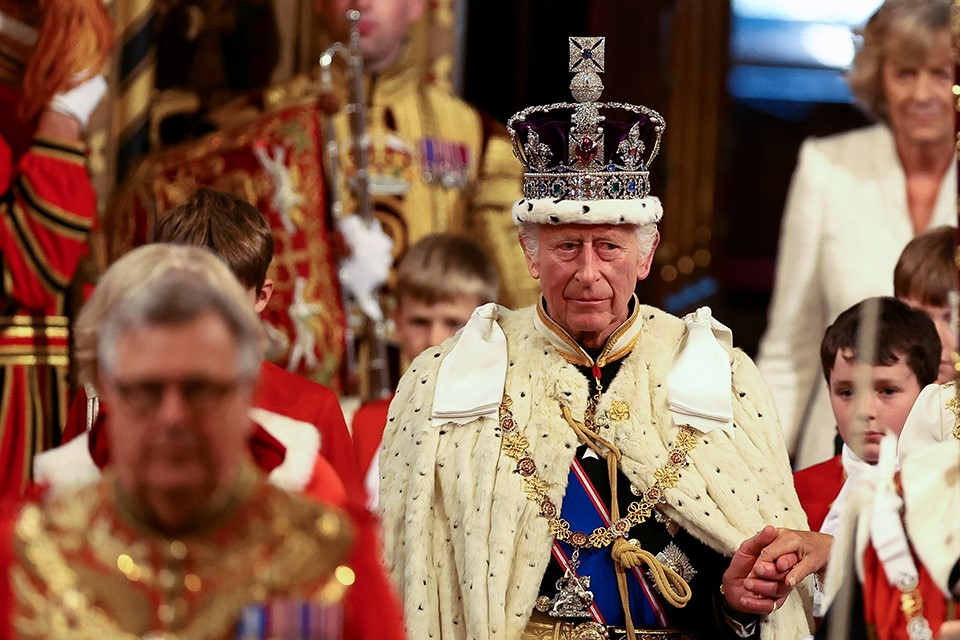
The King proceeds through the royal gallery

On the morning of 17 July, Samantha Dixon MP, as Vice-Chamberlain of the Household, was "taken hostage" at Buckingham Palace to ensure the King's safe return from Parliament. Charles III and Queen Camilla then travelled from Buckingham Palace to Westminster in the Diamond Jubilee State Coach, escorted by the Household Cavalry. The route was lined with military personnel, including members of the Grenadier Guards, Irish Guards and Coldstream Guards, as well as members of the RAF and Royal Navy. The King and Queen entered the Palace of Westminster through the Sovereign's Entrance, reserved exclusively for the monarch, and changed into the Robes of State, before proceeding to the House of Lords, where the King would read the speech from the throne. MPs from the House of Commons were summoned to attend the Lords by Sarah Clarke, who holds the office of Black Rod. As a symbol of the House of Commons' independence from the reigning monarch, the doors to the chamber were closed upon Clarke's approach, requiring her to knock three times for it to be opened. Once MPs had assembled in the Lords, Charles III then read the King's Speech. The speech, prepared by the UK government, set out its planned programme of legislation for the next session of parliament, and was read by the King in a neutral tone so as not to show any appearance of political support. MPs listened to the speech in silence, before returning to the Commons, where a debate on the speech began two hours or so later.

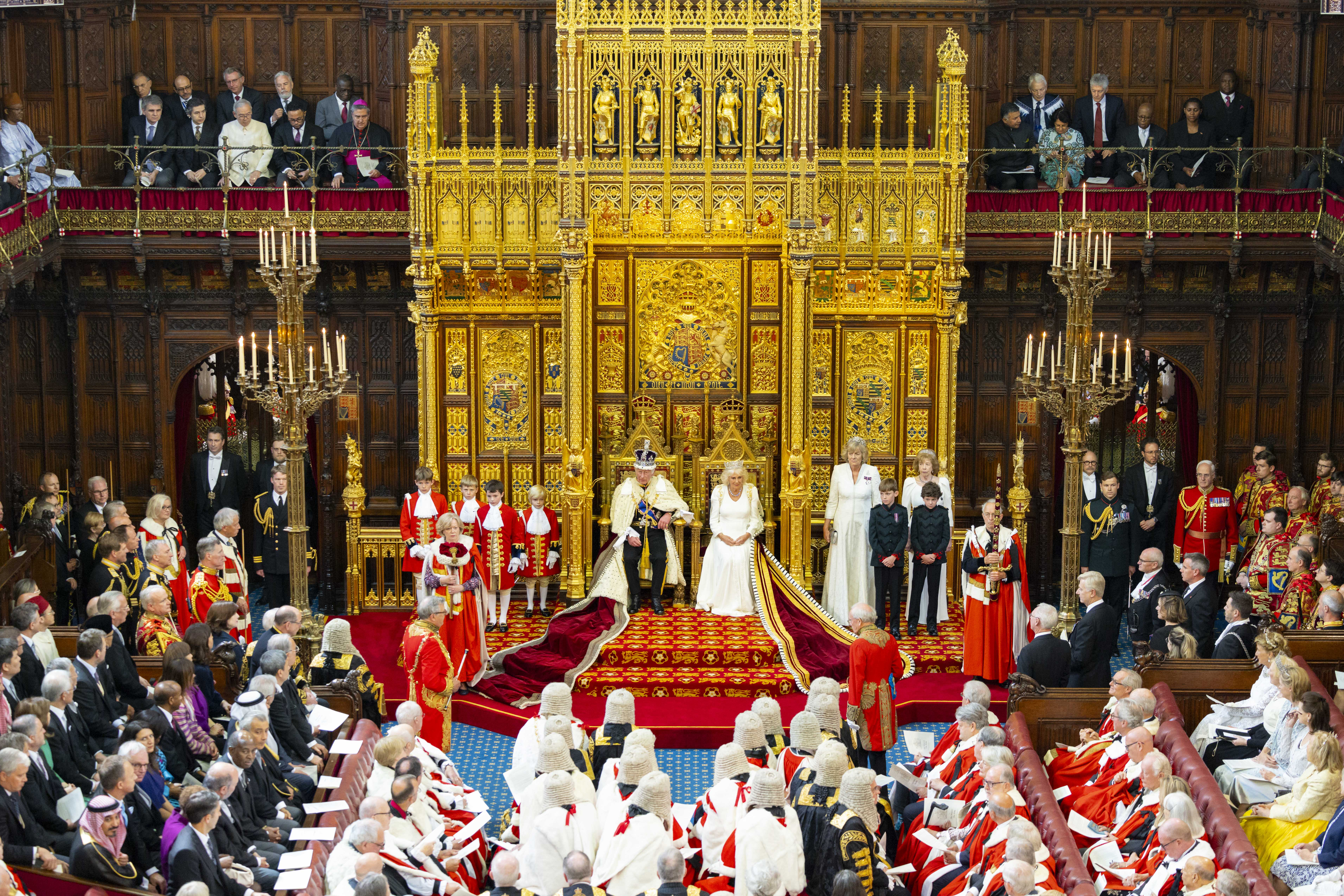
The King and Queen enthroned.

At 1,421 words, it was the longest monarch's speech to be delivered to Parliament since 2003. The occasion also coincided with the Queen's 77th birthday.

== Legislative programme ==
The twelve minute speech included 39 pieces of legislation that Labour hoped to pass during the forthcoming parliamentary session, with a focus on helping to improve economic growth. Chief among these were plans to change planning rules in order to facilitate the building of housing and infrastructure. Plans were also announced to renationalise the railways, strengthen the rights of employees, devolve powers to regional mayors, tackle illegal immigration and reform the House of Lords. In addition, a number of bills proposed by the previous Conservative administration were also included, notably the Tobacco and Vapes Bill, which had appeared in the 2023 King's Speech, but had been abandoned after the election was called.

However, Labour's election manifesto pledges to reduce the UK voting age from 18 to 16 was absent from the programme. Speaking about the voting age, Lucy Powell, the Leader of the House of Commons, told the BBC it remained a government commitment and that she hoped the age would be lowered by the time of the next general election. Starmer had also faced pressure from some of his own MPs, as well as the Scottish National Party, to scrap the two-child benefit cap, but this was also not included.

=== Bills ===
- The Passenger Railway Services Bill enabling the government to renationalise the railways.
- The Railways Bill to establish Great British Railways, a body overseeing the rail network.
- The Better Buses Bill allowing greater scope for local government to take over the running of bus services.
- The High Speed Rail Bill to enable powers to improve rail services in northern England.
- The English Devolution Bill to facilitate the devolvement of power to elected mayors of combined authorities.
- Reform of the House of Lords. Two separate bills: to phase out the remaining hereditary peers in the House of Lords (House of Lords (Hereditary Peers) Bill), and to increase the number of female bishops in the House (Lords Spiritual (Women) Act 2015 (Extension) Bill).
- The Budget Responsibility Bill requiring an official budget forecast to take place ahead of a government budget.
- The Pension Schemes Bill introducing new rules and requirements for private sector pension schemes.
- The Planning and Infrastructure Bill to simplify the approval process for critical infrastructure, and update compulsory purchase rules.
- The Renters' Rights Bill banning no-fault evictions and extending building safety requirements to the private sector.
- The Leasehold and Commonhold Reform Bill curbing ground rent costs and banning forfeiture.
- The Great British Energy Bill to establish GB Energy, a state owned energy investment and generation company.
- The National Wealth Fund Bill establishing a £7.3bn fund to be invested over five years in infrastructure and green industry.
- The Water (Special Measures) Bill giving the water regulator Ofwat greater powers to prevent water company bosses from receiving bonuses, and to make water company bosses liable for any illegal activity.
- The Crime and Policing Bill to give police greater powers to deal with antisocial behaviour. The bill will also make assaulting retail workers a specific offence.
- The Terrorism (Protection of Premises) Bill to require venues to establish procedures for dealing with terrorist threats, enacting Martyn's Law.
- The Victims, Courts and Public Protection Bill requiring offenders to attend sentencing hearings and removing parental rights from convicted sex offenders.
- The Border Security, Asylum and Immigration Bill enabling police to use anti-terrorism laws to tackle gangs who smuggle asylum seekers to the UK.
- The Employment Rights Bill introducing a number new rights for workers, and banning the "exploitative" use of zero hour contracts.
- The Race Equality Bill extending the right to make a claim for equal pay under the Equality Act to people from ethnic minorities and people with disabilities.
- The Tobacco and Vapes Bill to bring in a phased ban on smoking.
- The Mental Health Bill to tighten rules on sectioning people, and change the rules on care for people with learning difficulties.
- The Children's Wellbeing Bill requiring local authorities to keep a register of children not in full time education at school, and establish breakfast clubs for all primary schools in England.
- The Skills England Bill to establish a public body to improve and devolve skills training.
- The Conversion Practices Bill restricting "abusive" practices designed to change a person's sexual orientation or gender identity.
- The Digital Information and Smart Data Bill enabling people to use a digital ID to buy age-restricted content and for pre-employment checks.
- The Cyber Security and Resilience Bill establishing new rules to protect critical infrastructure from cyber attacks.
- Hillsborough law: A piece of legislation requiring public servants to be truthful during public inquiries.
- A bill allowing the Crown Estate to borrow from the government in order to invest in new infrastructure projects.
- The Football Governance Bill to establish a regulator for the top five tiers of English football.
- A bill to establish an Armed Forces Commissioner with powers to inspect faulty kit and equipment.

== Response ==
Responding to the speech, Leader of the Opposition and Leader of the Conservative Party Rishi Sunak said his party would not oppose the government "for the sake of it", but would hold them to account on their election promises. On proposals to change planning laws, he said that though such changes were needed "a system that does not allow local people to have a say will damage public consent for more housing in the long term". Daisy Cooper, the deputy leader of the Liberal Democrats, welcomed the proposals on Mental Health Act but called for greater ambition on health and social care. Stephen Gethins of the Scottish National Party, called for the government to reverse the "hard Tory Brexit" arguing it was "the biggest thing pulling back growth", and criticised the government for not removing the two-child benefit cap. Richard Tice, deputy leader of Reform UK, argued Labour's plans would increase tax and lead to greater regulation. Green Party MP Ellie Chowns called for "bolder action" on building regulations and rent controls.

Writing in The Guardian, Martin Kettle argued that in his first King's Speech, Starmer was taking a long term approach: "trying to balance impatience for change with the inevitability that the process will be gradual". BBC economics editor Faisal Islam suggested that it would "take well into next year before we see any impact on economic growth from these plans". The BBC's Ben Chu observed that a number of challenges inherited from the previous government had not been addressed in the speech, including public sector pay, which would need to be addressed by the end of July when the public sector pay review for the 2024–25 financial year must be concluded. Failure to do so, he argued, could make government plans to recruit more nurses and teachers more difficult, and even risk further strikes.

Plans to renationalise the railways were welcomed by rail unions, who said the industry would be "run as a public service, not for private profit", with Mick Whelan, the general secretary of ASLEF, describing it as "the right decision, at the right time". However, the plans were viewed less favourably by the UK's 14 train operators. Andy Bagnall, chief executive of their umbrella organisation, Rail Partners, described the establishment of Great British Railways as "an important milestone", but said "Full nationalisation is a political not a practical solution, which will increase costs over time".

== Subsequent events ==
On the same day the King's Speech was delivered, Starmer announced the establishment of a child poverty task force to investigate how best to support the estimated four million children living in poverty, a figure which was said to have increased by 700,000 since 2010. Skills England, a body whose objective will be to reduce the need for overseas employees by improving skills training for people in England, was launched on 22 July.

Former prime minister Liz Truss wrote a letter of complaint to Cabinet Secretary Simon Case over a reference to her September 2022 mini-budget as being "disastrous". The term was removed after she described it as untrue, and a "flagrant breach" of the civil service code.
