= Theo Naledi =

South African-born Motswana Anglican bishop

Theophilus Naledi is a retired Bishop of Botswana in the Church of the Province of Central Africa, who was born at Bothithong near Vryburg in South Africa in 1936.

== Early career ==
Naledi had his primary education at Bothithong, going to nearby Taung for his secondary schooling. From there he went up to St Bede's Theological College at Mthatha where he studied for three years prior to ordination.

Naledi was ordained as a deacon at St Cyprian's Cathedral, Kimberley, in the Diocese of Kimberley and Kuruman in 1959, and as a priest the following year. He served the diocese for 10 years.

== Botswana ==
At the end of 1970 Naledi was invited to be a parish priest in Gaborone, Botswana. “Back then, we used the Trinity building and we belonged to the Matabeleland Diocese under Bishop Kenneth Skelton,” Naledi recalled.

Anglicans in Botswana felt at the time that being part of the Diocese of Matebeleland meant that their church remained “foreign in its own country” (previously it had been part of the Diocese of Kimberley and Kuruman). In 1972 the Diocese of Botswana was inaugurated with C. Shannon Mallory, an American, as its first bishop. Malory served for six years and during his tenure Gaborone’s Cathedral of the Holy Cross was built.

Theophilus Naledi was serving at Lobatse (where he was appointed Archdeacon in 1976) in the south of Botswana at the time that Mallory was succeeded by Khotso Makhulu in 1978. At this time Naledi furthered his studies, firstly enrolling with UNISA for the degree of Bachelor of Theology. He was appointed principal of the Botswana Theological Training Programme which was founded by a number of churches including the Anglican and Lutheran Churches, the United Congregational Church of Southern Africa and the Church of God in Christ. Naledi served as principal for three years before going, in 1983, to King's College and being awarded, in 1985, a Master of Theology degree by the University of London.

Naledi was ordained to the episcopate and was consecrated as Bishop of Matabeleland in September 1987. He was translated to the Diocese of Botswana as Bishop of Botswana in December 2000.

Naledi was succeeded in 2009 by Trevor Mwamba.

== Commemoration ==
In September 2009 the Anglican Cathedral in Gaborone hosted the 21st anniversary of the consecration of retired bishop Theo Naledi. Trevor Mwamba, Bishop of the Botswana, officiated while the sermon was preached by Raphael Hess, Bishop of Saldanha Bay, South Africa.

Church of England titles
Preceded by Robert Mercer	Bishop of Matabeleland; 1987-2000	Succeeded by Wilson Sitshebo
Preceded by Walter Khotso Makhulu	Bishop of Botswana; 2000–2009	Succeeded by Trevor Mwamba
