= Trevor Mwamba =

Zambian Anglican bishop (born 1958)

The Right Reverend Trevor Mwamba
- Bishop of Botswana
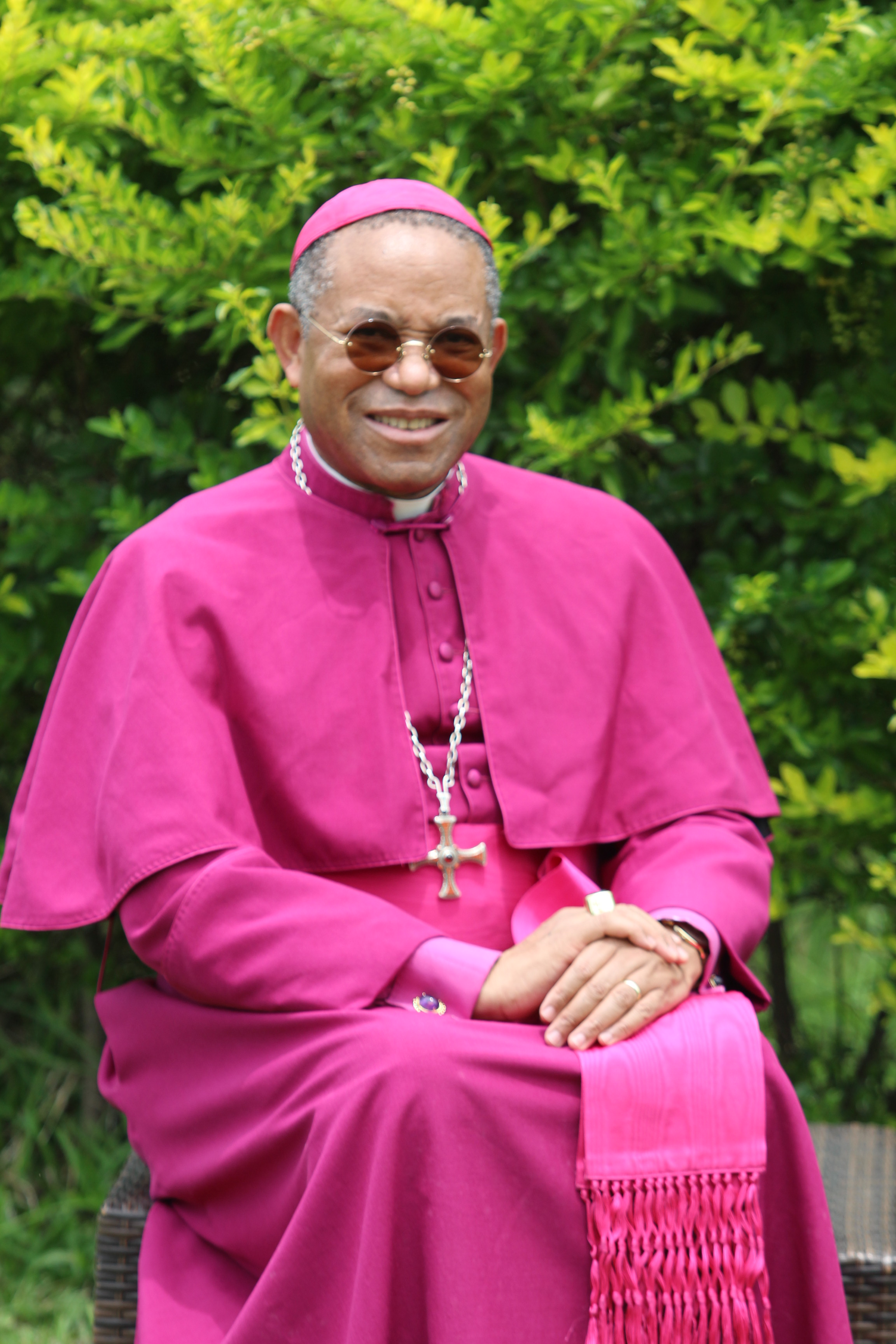
- Bishop Trevor Mwamba in 2021
- Church: Church of the Province of Central Africa
- Diocese: Anglican Diocese of Botswana
- In office: 2005–2013
- Predecessor: Theo Naledi
- Successor: Metlhayotlhe Beleme
- Other post: Team Rector of Barking (2013–2019)

Orders
- Ordination: 1984 (deacon); 1985 (priest) by Mark Santer (deacon)
- Consecration: 2005

Personal details
- Born: Musonda Trevor Selwyn Mwamba; 7 May 1958 (age 68)
- Denomination: Anglicanism
- Spouse: Mmasekgoa Masire-Mwamba
- Children: 3
- Occupation: President of United National Independence Party
- Education: Doctor of Divinity (Honoris Causa) (Yale University ) 2009. M.Phil. Social Anthropology (University of Oxford ) 1998. M.A. Theology (University of Oxford ) 1988. Cert. Theology (University of Oxford ) 1984. BA (Honours) Theology (University of Oxford ) 1983. LL.B (University of Zambia ) 1981.

Musonda Trevor Selwyn Mwamba (born 1958), known as Trevor Mwamba, is an Anglican bishop. He was consecrated Bishop of Botswana on 6 February 2005. He tendered his resignation as Bishop of Botswana on 30 September 2012 – the day on which Botswana marks the anniversary of its independence from Britain. On 4 April 2021, he was elected President of the United National Independence Party in Zambia.

He took up the post of Team Rector of Barking in the Church of England on 1 January 2014, a post he resigned in December 2019. On 9 November 2013 he was made an honorary assistant bishop in the Diocese of Chelmsford.

He made a cameo appearance on the third episode of the HBO and BBC co-produced miniseries The No. 1 Ladies' Detective Agency. He appears in the episode entitled "Poison" as himself thanking members of the business community of Gaborone for their donations to the fictional orphanage portrayed in the series. He is married to Mmasekgoa Masire-Mwamba, a Commonwealth Deputy Secretary-General from 2008 to 2014.

He was made a deacon at Petertide 1984 (1 July) by Mark Santer, Bishop of Kensington (by letters dimissory from Leonard Mwenda, Bishop of Lusaka), at St Luke's, Chelsea, Greater London and served briefly as curate of All Saints, Notting Hill. He left the UK in 1985 to become Rector of Luanshya and Vocations Director for Central Zambia, and was ordained a priest that year.

On 4 April 2021, he won the presidency of the United National Independence Party (UNIP). He managed to wrestle power away from long time incumbent Tilyenji Kaunda who held on to power for 20 years after succeeding his father Dr. Kenneth Kaunda. This marks the first time that UNIP has not been led by a Kaunda family member since the 1960s.

== Personal life ==
Bishop Musonda Trevor Selwyn Mwamba was born in Mansa, Zambia, on 7 May 1958. He is married to Mmasekgoa Masire-Mwamba with whom he has 3 children. Mmasekgoa Masire Mwamba is the daughter of former President of Botswana Sir Ketumile Joni Masire.

== Career history ==
=== 2021–present ===
Bishop Trevor Mwamba is the President of United National Independence Party (UNIP).

=== 2019–to present ===
Bishop Trevor Mwamba is an assistant bishop in the Anglican Diocese in Europe.

=== 2013–2019 ===
He was the assistant Bishop, Chelmsford, Vicar of Barking, St. Margaret of Antioch, Barking. Bishop Mwamba was also a member of the civic ministry to the London Borough of Barking and Dagenham.

=== 2005–2013 ===
He was the Bishop of Botswana in the Church of the Province of Central Africa - comprising Botswana, Malawi, Zambia, and Zimbabwe. He performed all spiritual and temporal functions of a Bishop. He presided at official state occasions, including the Inauguration of the President of Botswana, Seretse Khama Ian Khama, the Annual Openings of the Judicial Legal Year of the High Court of Botswana. Bishop Mwamba maintained excellent working relationships with all levels of government which he still holds to this day. He forged strong relationships with diplomats from many countries. Officiated at diplomatic functions, as speaker and leading prayers.

=== 2008 ===
Bishop Mwamba was a participant in a foreign policy discussion with two former American national security advisors, General Brent Scowcroft and Professor Zbigniew Brzezinski, at the Washington National Cathedral. During this time he also acted as mediator for the province of Central Africa, focusing on conflict resolution. He has cultivated strong working relations with international organizations, served on the UN Civil Society Advisory Committee and officiated at the Southern Africa Development Community Parliamentary Forum (2007). Bishop Mwamba was regularly invited to speak on global issues by various institutions. He was the official liaison for the All Africa Conference of Churches to the Southern Africa Development Community and facilitator at the 2008 Lambeth Conference. He also coordinated the amendments to the constitution of the Council of Anglican Provinces in Africa.

Bishop Trevor Mwamba was responsible for the increase of the Diocese of Botswana's Real Estate portfolio significantly by purchase and development.

=== 2002–2005 ===
Bishop Mwamba was Vicar General, Diocese of Botswana, he performed all spiritual and temporal functions in the Diocese in the absence of the Bishop. He drafted constitutions for the Botswana Council of Churches and Young Women’s Christian Fellowship.

=== 1999–2005 ===
Bishop Mwamba was the Head of Legal & Compliance, Corporate Affairs and Company Secretary for

Standard Chartered Bank Botswana Limited. (Concurrent roles)

He ensured the Bank operated to highest standards of conduct and compliance with all regulatory requirements of the Bank of Botswana (Reserve Bank) and Group Compliance policies. He initiated and managed pro-active advisory service in regard to issues which could have a significant legal impact, to ensure compliance with regulatory framework at all times. He tailored. Group Anti Money Laundering framework to national context. He developed and maintained effective relationships with Regulators in the region. He raised awareness of compliance in every area of the business. Bishop Mwamba also saved the Bank thousands of pounds in legal fees acting as the banks in-house lawyer.

As Head of Corporate Affairs, he improved the image and reputation of the Bank nationally and internationally. He coordinated relationship and initiatives with all stakeholders; government, regulators, investors, analysts, clients, customers, and local communities. He implemented Communication Policy, coordinating all internal and external channels. Bishop Mwamba was the spokesperson for the bank and coordinated all internal and external communication with the media. He produced Annual Report and managed Annual General Meetings. As Company Secretary, Bishop Mwamba was secretary of Board of Directors of Standard Chartered Bank. He coordinated quarterly board meetings, Audit, and Annual General Meeting. He managed issuing of dividends to all shareholders as well as managed the share split on the Botswana Stock Exchange.

=== 1997–1999 ===
Bishop Mwamba was assistant Priest, Wolvecote, Oxford, UK

=== 1996–1998 ===
Bishop Mwamba was assistant Chaplain of Keble College, Oxford, UK

=== 1987–2000 ===
Bishop Mwamba was Provincial Secretary, Personal Assistant to the then Archbishop Khotso Makhulu, Diocesan Secretary Diocese of Botswana, Church of the Province of Central Africa (Concurrent roles) He was responsible for coordinating the work of dioceses within the Province. He also acted as Secretary to the Provincial Synod, Provincial Standing Committee and Episcopal Synod and responsible for executing the decisions passed by these bodies. To this day he maintains links with governments as well as both local and international organizations. He was also Personal Assistant and legal advisor to the then Archbishop of Central Africa, Dr. Khotso W. P. Makhulu.

=== 1991 ===
Bishop Mwamba created the first Provincial Canon of the Province by Episcopal Synod.

=== 1988 ===
Bishop Mwamba was secretary to the African Bishops regional meeting at the Lambeth Conference.

=== 1985–1986 ===
Bishop Mwamba was the Parish Priest of St George’s Church, Luanshya, Zambia. He also acted as Vocational Director for the Diocese of Central Zambia.

=== 1984–1985 ===
Bishop Mwamba was the curate at All Saints, Notting Hill, London, UK

=== 1981 ===
Bishop Mwamba was legal researcher at the Ministry of Legal Affairs, Zambia

== Committees and boards ==
Chaplain to the Mayor of the Borough of Barking and Dagenham 2019-

Chairperson Barking and Dagenham Faith Forum: 2018 - 2019

Chairperson Barking and Ilford United Charities: 2013 - 2019

Trustee - St. Augustine Foundation: 2014 -

Trustee - Nepton Charity: 2013-2019

== Lecturer ==
New Bishops in the Anglican Communion Course Canterbury Cathedral: 2014-

Member – The Queen Elizabeth 11 Diamond Jubilee Trust Botswana Task Force. (2012 - 2013)

Co-Chair – All Africa Anglican-Lutheran Commission (2007 - 2011)

Board member – All Africa Conference of Churches General Committee (2008 - 2013)

Commissioner – Anglican-Lutheran International Commission (2006 - 2011)

Board member Botswana Centre for Human Rights (Ditshwanelo) (1990 - 2013)

Board member – Transparency International Botswana (1999 -2013)

Committee member – UN Civil Society Advisory Committee. (2008 -2013)

Board member – The Community Advisory Board (Botswana Baylor Children's Clinical Centre of Excellence) (2007 - 2013)

== Publications ==
Coronavirus a Parable of Our Time (2020)

https://anglicanism.org/index-papers/culture-society

https://anglicanism.org/author/the-rt-revd-trevor-mwamba

https://www.facebook.com/anglicanism.org

- Anglicans and Sexuality: A Way Forward? LSE: 2016
- Law and Religion in Africa: Living Expressions and Channels of Co- Operation.
- African Human Rights Law Journal - AHRLJ Volume 14 No.1 2014
- Saving the Soul of Anglicanism: Blessing or Curse; The African Experience. Modern Believing Church and Society 50:2: 21-32 Modern Church people’s Union (April 2009).
- The Lambeth Conference 2008 and the Millennium Development Goals: A Botswana Perspective. Journal of Anglican Studies 7: 229-242 Cambridge University Press (2009).
- Review of Africa: Altered States, Ordinary Miracles by Richard Dowden, for The Times, 19 September 2008. (http://tr.im/Gbyr)
- Foreword to Living Love: In Conversation with the No. 1 Ladies’ Detective Agency by John Inge, Inspire (2007).
- Author, Dancing Sermons, Maclean Dubois (2006), Reprinted by SPCK, 2007
- The evolving role of the Church: the case of democratization in Zambia, Three Centuries of Mission, Daniel O’Connor and others, Continuum (2000).
- Awards: Honorary Freeman of Barking and Dagenham.
- The Freedom of the London Borough of Barking and Dagenham bestowed on 30 September 2020.
- This is the highest award that the Councils in the United Kingdom can bestow. Rarely awarded, it is awarded to local people who have, in the opinion of the Council, rendered eminent services to the Borough.

== Additional Information ==
Radio and film: starred in the Number 1 Ladies’ Detective Agency film directed by Anthony Minghella, and television episode 2: Poison.

Featured in over seven books of Alexander McCall Smith’s best selling series the No. 1 Detective Ladies’ Agency.

Anglican Communion titles
Preceded by Theo Naledi	Bishop of Botswana; 2005–2012	Succeeded by Metlhayotlhe Beleme
