= The No. 1 Ladies' Detective Agency (TV series) =

British series (2008–2009)

- Title sequence
- Genre: Comedy drama
- Created by: Richard Curtis; Anthony Minghella
- Based on: The No. 1 Ladies' Detective Agency by Alexander McCall Smith
- Written by: Richard Curtis; Nicholas Wright; Robert Jones
- Directed by: Anthony Minghella; Charles Sturridge; Tim Fywell
- Starring: Jill Scott; Anika Noni Rose; Lucian Msamati; Desmond Dube
- Music by: Gabriel Yared
- Countries of origin: United Kingdom; United States
- Original languages: English; Tswana
- No. of episodes: 1 pilot episode and 6 episodes

Production
- Executive producers: Bob Weinstein; Harvey Weinstein; Anthony Minghella; Sydney Pollack; Richard Curtis; Amy J. Moore
- Producer: Timothy Bricknell
- Production location: Botswana
- Cinematography: Seamus McGarvey; Giulio Biccari
- Running time: 109 minutes (pilot); 56–58 minutes (regular episodes)

Original release
- Network: BBC One / BBC HD (UK); HBO (USA)
- Release: 23 March 2008 – 19 April 2009

The No. 1 Ladies' Detective Agency is a television comedy-drama series, produced by the BBC in conjunction with HBO, and based on the novels of the same name by Alexander McCall Smith. The novels focus on the story of a detective agency opened by Mma Ramotswe and her courtship with the mechanic Mr. J. L. B. Matekoni. The series was filmed on location in Botswana and was seen as one of the first major television productions to be undertaken in Botswana. (Note: The Gods Must Be Crazy, a 1980 film set in Botswana, was filmed mainly in South Africa.)

The programme began with a feature-length television film, broadcast in the UK on the BBC on 23 March 2008. Executive producer Anthony Minghella directed the film and co-wrote the adaptation with fellow executive producer Richard Curtis. A six-episode series was ordered in November 2008, and the BBC began broadcasting it in the UK on 15 March 2009. HBO began broadcasting the series on 29 March 2009, starting with the feature-length film, which was broadcast as a pilot. In 2010, the show won a Peabody Award for its 2009 season. It was cancelled after one season despite positive reviews.

While HBO did not renew the show after its first series, they announced in summer 2011 that the series might continue as two or more standalone films. The following year, HBO revealed they had decided not to move forward with the project.

== Production ==
=== Origins ===
The production was initially envisaged as a theatrical feature film, rather than a television series. British director Anthony Minghella was a fan of the books and, after optioning the film rights, worked with the publishers to write a blurb for the paperback edition. Minghella was committed to directing the project himself but it was several years before his schedule allowed pre-production to commence. Producer Amy J. Moore was a catalyst in the decision to film on location in Botswana. Minghella, having filmed The English Patient in Africa, was concerned with the realities of importing equipment and housing the cast and crew for the production. Moore had travelled extensively in Africa, including in Botswana, and had worked on promoting South African film and bringing African-produced plays to an Off-Broadway setting. A friend approached her with the novel in 2000 and she greatly enjoyed it. Once attached to the project, she convinced Minghella to visit Botswana with her in 2004 and took him camping in the Makgadikgadi Pans. The promise of funding from the country's government convinced Minghella to shoot on location. Minghella also approached The Weinstein Company for funding and Harvey Weinstein commented that he thought it was important to fund the production, because it would be impossible to sell to a network or studio solely as a concept.

Production on the pilot (at that point still intended as a potential theatrical feature film) began on 2 July 2007. At this stage, the producers were Sydney Pollack and Minghella of Mirage Productions and Weinstein. Weinstein commented on the project, saying that "like all fans of Alexander McCall Smith's magisterial books, I became enchanted with the wonders and charms of Botswana." Oscar-winning director Anthony Minghella helmed the film and co-wrote the teleplay with Oscar nominated writer Richard Curtis. Although McCall Smith declined to write the adaptation, he remained involved as an adviser and visited the set during production. While filming, Minghella publicly expressed concerns about how the film might be received in cinemas, because the story was far removed from crime genre conventions and had little action. Minghella raised the possibility of it appearing on television instead.

=== Crew ===
Anthony Minghella, Timothy Bricknell and Amy J. Moore produced the pilot episode, with Richard Curtis, Sydney Pollack and Harvey Weinstein as executive producers. Bricknell produced the series, with Curtis, Moore and Bob and Harvey Weinstein acting as executive producers. Minghella and Pollack also receive this credit, even though both died before the full series entered production. The project was filmed in Botswana and the majority of the crew were locals.

=== Cast and characters ===
Anika Noni Rose as Mma Makutsi, Jill Scott as Mma Ramotswe, and Lucian Msamati as Rra J.L. B. Matekoni

Grammy Award-winning American singer and actress Jill Scott stars as the titular detective Mma Ramotswe. Tony Award-winning American actress Anika Noni Rose plays assistant detective Mma Grace Makutsi. British-Tanzanian London theatre actor Lucian Msamati plays car mechanic J. L. B. Matekoni. South African actor and comedian Desmond Dube plays BK, owner of the Last Chance Salon and friend to Mma Ramotswe.

British actors Colin Salmon, Idris Elba, and David Oyelowo also feature in the pilot. Elba plays Charlie Gotso, an adversary to Mma Ramotswe. Salmon plays Mma Ramotswe's abusive ex-husband and trumpet player Note Mokoti. Oyelowo plays cheating husband Kremlin Busang. South African actor and Tony award winner John Kani also appears as 'dubious' Daddy Bapetsi. Nigerian-born British actor Nikki Amuka-Bird plays jealous wife Alice Busang. Oyelowo, Kani and Amuka Bird all receive star billing in the feature-length pilot but did not continue as series regulars.

British actor Paterson Joseph joined the cast in a recurring role as Cephas Buthulezi, a rival detective. Tau Maseremule and Thabo Malema play Rra Matekoni's young apprentices, Fanwell and Charlie. South African actor Vusi Kunene has a recurring role as Dr. Gulubane.

The Right Rev. Musonda Trevor Selwyn Mwamba, the Bishop of Botswana, makes a cameo appearance as himself in the series' third episode.

==== Casting ====
Casting the roles of Mma Makutsi and Rra J. L. B. Matekoni was completed early in the project. However, casting Mma Ramotswe proved to be more of a challenge. Producer Timothy Bricknell states that the character's build and age excludes most well known actresses and that they initially began looking for an actress in Botswana before expanding their search throughout Africa and eventually on to London and Los Angeles. Jill Scott was shortlisted for the role but the producers were uncertain because of her relative lack of acting experience. Minghella decided to cast her after viewing clips of her poetry readings and musical performance and noting her rare screen presence. The decision was made just two weeks before production began.

=== Locations ===
The television film pilot episode and the six later episodes were all shot on location in Botswana. It was the first major production to be filmed in Botswana and the government reportedly provided five million dollars of funding for the project. The producers signed a 10-year-lease in 2007 for the area at the bottom of Kgale Hill in Gaborone locally known as "Kgaleview" where the detective agency set is located.

=== Broadcast ===
Minghella's standalone television film premiered on the BBC on 23 March 2008, only five days after Anthony Minghella suddenly died of a haemorrhage. The BBC announced it as the centrepiece of its 2008 winter schedule and broadcast it in the Easter weekend slot at 21:00 on Easter Sunday on BBC One. The film was a huge success, watched by 6.87 million viewers (27% share) in the UK, easily beating ITV1's He Kills Coppers.

In November 2008, it was announced that HBO and the BBC had partnered to order a further six one-hour episodes. The collaboration marked the Weinstein Company's first foray into television.

The 6-episode series premiered on the BBC on 15 March 2009. The film ran in the United States as the feature-length pilot of the series, which was broadcast on HBO beginning on 29 March 2009.

=== Themes ===
Bricknell has stated that the production showcases a modern, relatively prosperous African nation before a large television audience. He said that "People have talked about the responsibility of doing justice to Alexander McCall Smith's novel, but with this production, we also felt a strong sense of responsibility as white people making the first motion picture filmed entirely in Botswana, and presenting modern Botswana to the rest of the world."

Moore has commented that the story struck her with the idea "That leading a good life is possible; that being a good person is possible; that being a good neighbour is possible; that truth can exist alongside beauty. I thought, this African book can teach the Western world a lot."

Minghella called the experience of filming in Botswana an "amazing adventure" and noted the beauty of the country's landscapes. He said "Particularly fascinating to me was working and filming in an African country where old and new are currently coexisting, where traditional values have not yet been eroded by the demands and efficiencies and neuroses of the modern. It was a privilege to be working on a film which celebrates what we can learn from Africa, and not what we think we can teach it."

== Episodes ==
=== Pilot (2008) ===
The pilot episode had a 109-minute run time.

No.	Title	Directed by	Written by	Original release date	UK viewers (millions)
0	"The No. 1 Ladies' Detective Agency"	Anthony Minghella	Anthony Minghella & Richard Curtis	23 March 2008	6.87 million
Precious Ramotswe sells her late father's cows and moves to the city to become Botswana's first, finest, and only, female private detective. With the help of her friends, Rra J. L B. Matekoni, proprietor of Tlokweng Road Speedy Motors and Mma Makutsi, the fastest-typing secretary in Gaborone, she must solve the mysteries of a missing finger, a dubious Daddy, and a cheating husband.

=== TV series (2009) ===
No.	Title	Directed by	Written by	Original release date	UK viewers (millions)
1	"The Big Bonanza"	Charles Sturridge	Nicholas Wright	15 March 2009	5.84
Botswana's No. 1 Ladies' Detective Agency is in desperate need of clients. To boost business, Mma Makutsi prints up flyers, which seem to do the trick. Mma Ramotswe soon finds herself hunting down an absconding apostolic, finding a disappearing dog, and checking up on a definitely disturbed dentist.
2	"Poison"	Charles Sturridge	Nicholas Wright	22 March 2009	3.92
Mma Ramotswe gets caught between a dangerous case of ivory smuggling and a feuding family when she is asked to investigate the unusual behaviour of Rra Lisindi, owner of Lisindi's curio shop, and the case of a possible poisoner. Meanwhile, Mma Makutsi is entrusted with the task of solving Tlokweng Hospital's spate of mysteriously regular deaths.
3	"The Boy With the African Heart"	Charles Sturridge	Nicholas Wright	29 March 2009	3.71
Mma Ramotswe is helping Mrs Curtin (C. C. H. Pounder) to find her son who has been missing for 10 years. Unsure whether he is alive or dead, Mma Ramotswe digs up his past, only to uncover some shocking truths. Meanwhile, keen to prove her worth as an assistant detective rather than just a secretary, Mma Makutsi is left trying to solve the Kgale Hill break-ins.
4	"Problems in Moral Philosophy"	Tim Fywell	Robert Jones	5 April 2009	3.79
Mma Pekwane suspects her husband has bought a stolen car. Mma Ramotswe offers some creative advice, which involves a foray into auto theft. Mma Makutsi – complete with fabulous new Assistant Detective hairstyle – embarks on her first case, full of undercover operations, high speed car chases and quick getaways.
5	"Beauty and Integrity"	Tim Fywell	Robert Jones	12 April 2009	3.42
Mma Makutsi investigates the behaviour of contestants in a local beauty pageant, while Mma Ramotswe has trouble solving the case of Nandira Patel's mystery boyfriend. To make things worse, the contemptible Cephas Buthelezi opens a rival agency and is intent on taking the ladies down.
6	"A Real Botswana Diamond"	Tim Fywell	Robert Jones	19 April 2009	4.26
The No.1 Ladies are the latest victims of the Kgale Hill break-ins and Mma Ramotswe and Rra J. L. B. Matekoni's engagement is not going as smoothly as expected. Note Mokoti's return, fake diamonds and Cephas Buthelezei's ruthless attempt at blackmail, force Mma Ramotswe to face her demons before she can move on.

== Reception ==
=== Critical response ===
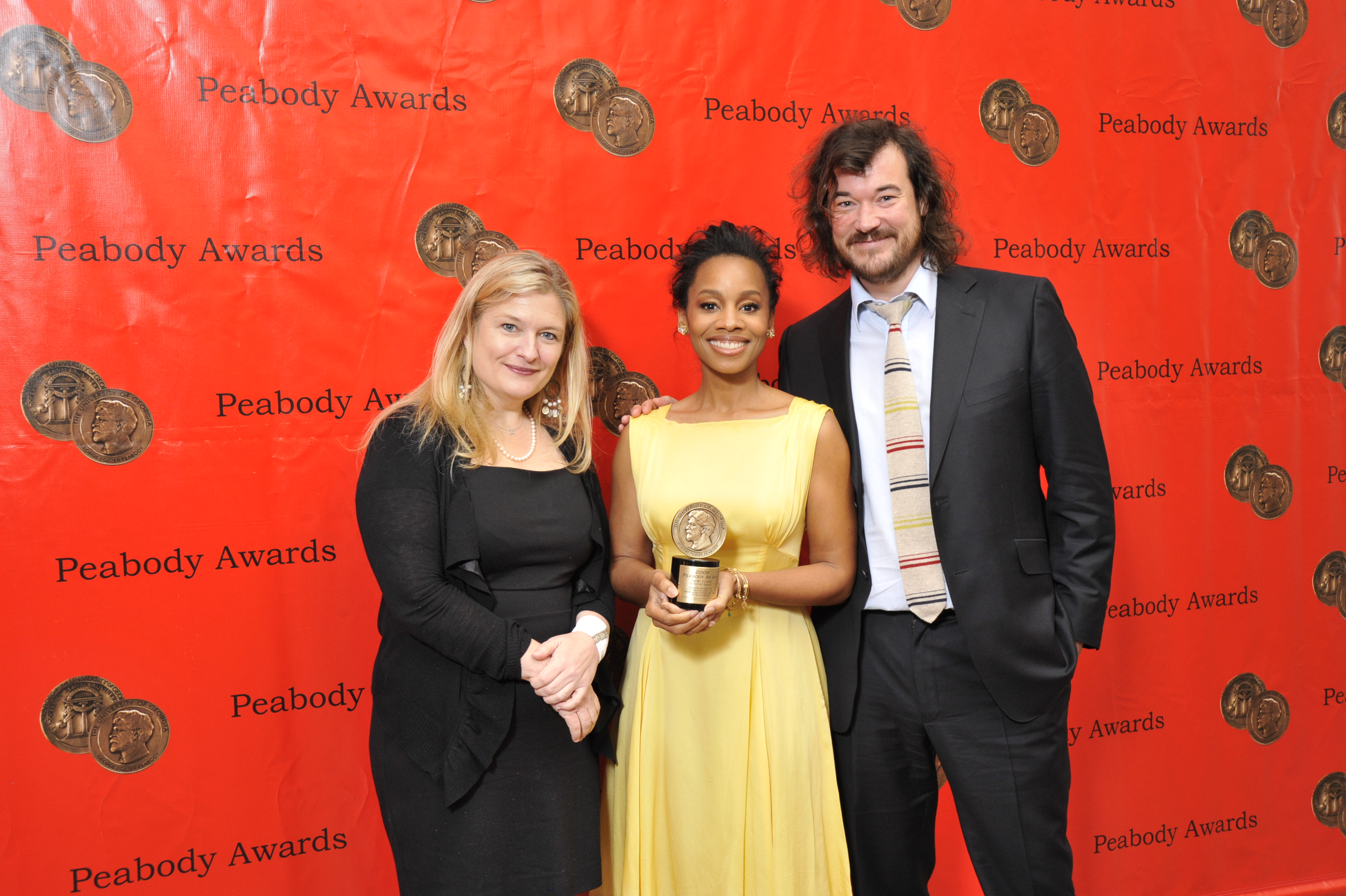
Amy Moore, Anika Noni Rose and Tim Bricknell at the 69th Annual Peabody Awards for No. 1 Ladies' Detective Agency

The series received generally positive reviews from most critics, based on an aggregate score of 71/100 from Metacritic. Rotten Tomatoes assigns the series a rating of 80%, its critical consensus stating: "The Botswana terrain makes for a beautiful backdrop in The No. 1 Ladies' Detective Agency, a faithful adaptation of the book that is leisurely paced, but well-structured, boasting a stellar performance by Jill Scott." The List said that Jill Scott's performance "effortlessly captures the blend of wisdom, compassion and understated humour that has made Precious Ramotswe such a popular creation." Some mainstream press reviewers were less impressed. The Guardian's reviewer summed it up as "Heartbeat, basically, relocated to Botswana, a beautiful African country where smiley happy people, cardboard cut-out characters, go about their business with good humour, hard work, morality and diligence." The Times' reviewer said "The problem is that Precious Ramotswe does not really live in Africa but in a verbal universe that is McCall Smith's own. His dialogue, so natural on the page, turned out to be unutterable, at least by the actors assembled here, who struggled to attain end-of-term play standards." But in The Independent, the reviewer, remarking on the recent death of its director and co-adaptor, Anthony Minghella, said "its merits are distinctively Minghella's own, and that in adapting Alexander McCall Smith's hugely popular and arguably emollient stories for the screen, he and Richard Curtis have found a way to stiffen their representation of African life without losing the sweet moral clarity of the originals."

=== Accolades ===
The series won a Peabody Award in 2009 "for offering us Africa, Africans and compelling narratives with great wit and charm."

== Impact on Botswana ==
The funding provided for the production allowed the country the economic benefits of hosting a major production. It also laid the foundations for future productions by training local cast and crew members that officials hope will generate a local film industry. Botswana also expects a tourism benefit from the series and is preserving the set, "Kgalewood", as part of a tour of Gaborone aimed at fans of the story.

== Cancellation ==
In August 2010, Michael Lombardo, HBO's director of programming, indicated that the show was not being renewed for a second season; however, two feature-length films continuing the series were being considered. In January 2011, HBO president Sue Naegle stated the television movies for the series were still in script phase, but that HBO intended to make the films. At the 2011 Television Critics Association summer press tour, HBO announced that the show would continue as two or more standalone films, with network executives reviewing the first script. However, in August 2012, it was announced that HBO had decided not to move forward with production.
