= C. Shannon Mallory =

The Right Reverend Charles Shannon Mallory
- Bishop of El Camino Real
- Church: Episcopal Church
- Diocese: El Camino Real
- Elected: June 21, 1980
- In office: 1980-1990
- Successor: Richard L. Shimpfky
- Previous posts: Bishop of Botswana (1972-1978); Assistant Bishop of Long Island (1978-1980)

Orders
- Ordination: 1961
- Consecration: December 31, 1972 by Peter Hatendi

Personal details
- Born: September 9, 1936 Dallas, Texas, United States
- Died: April 4, 2018 (aged 81) Monterey, California, United States
- Parents: William Lee Mallory & Hazelle Wisdom
- Spouse: Armonda Lou Ober (m. 1955) Antonia Pallette (m. 1990)
- Children: 5

Charles Shannon Mallory (September 9, 1936 – April 4, 2018), styled C. Shannon Mallory, was the inaugural Bishop of Botswana, consecrated in Gaborone in 1972; and afterwards inaugural Bishop of El Camino Real.

== Younger years, education and ordination and family ==
Charles Shannon Mallory was born September 9, 1936, in Texas to Hazel and William Lee Mallory. At a very young age his family moved to California and his childhood and school years were spent in Van Nuys, Los Angeles. He married his childhood sweetheart, Armonda Lou Mallory ("Mondi") on December 18, 1955, in St. Marks Episcopal Church, Van Nuys. Mallory graduated with a BA degree from the University of California (U.C.L.A.) in 1958. He proceeded to complete a Sacrae Theologiae Baccalaureus from the General Theological Seminary in New York City in 1961. Ordained deacon in that year by Bishop I.I. Curtis of the United States of America, he became a priest in Damaraland, South West Africa (Namibia) later the same year. Mallory later continued academic work and was awarded an MA from Rhodes University, Grahamstown, in 1971.

== Southern Africa ==
Following ordination, Mallory served in Damaraland, first as Rector of Tsumeb, until 1962, and subsequently as Director of the Ovamboland Mission, also in South West Africa (Namibia), from 1963 to 1969, serving as Archdeacon of Ovamboland from 1964. He spent two years as Chaplain to the Diocesan School for Girls in Grahamstown, South Africa, from 1970 to 1971, while also pursuing academic objectives, this being followed by a lectureship at Makerere University in Kampala, Uganda, from 1971 to 1972, prior to his election as first Bishop of Botswana.

== Inaugural Bishop of Botswana ==
Elected to head the new See of Botswana on June 24, 1972, it was on 31 December of that year, in Gaborone, that Mallory was consecrated by the Bishop of Mashonaland with the Bishops of Bloemfontein, Zululand, Matabeleland, Swaziland, and the Bishop Suffragan of Cape Town.

The new Diocese, formerly falling under the Diocese of Matabeleland, its Bishop in Bulawayo, had no more than six priests, a few widely scattered congregations, and, in the capital city, no cathedral. Mallory, who for lack of an Anglican cathedral had been consecrated in Gaborone’s Roman Catholic Cathedral, made the building of one amongst the goals of his episcopate, following consultation with his congregations as to immediate priorities. Anglicans and non-Anglicans of Gaborone contributed to the costs, companies and individuals; De Beers gave generously. By 1977 building commenced, and the new Cathedral of Holy Cross was dedicated by Mallory as one of his last official functions as Bishop of Botswana on 26 November 1978. It was not before September 2004, however, that the diocese obtained a title deed to the land on which the cathedral stood and hence it was only in that year, under Theo Naledi, that the cathedral was finally consecrated.

== Return to the USA ==
Mallory resigned from Botswana in 1978 and was, from 1979, Assisting Bishop in the Diocese of Long Island. He was soon after elected to the new Diocese of El Camino Real, California in 1980 and installed on October 11, 1980. Mallory served the diocese until his retirement in 1990.

== In retirement ==
While Bishop Mallory's longtime interests and specializations had been in global affairs, and in multi cultural and multi religious practices, more recently he had been developing and teaching on ministry to the dying.

== Death ==
Bishop Mallory died on April 4, 2018, in Monterey, California.

Church of England titles
Preceded by Inaugural appointment	Bishop of Botswana; 1972–1978	Succeeded by Walter Khotso Makhulu
