= David Bird =

David Bird may refer to:

- David Bird (bridge) (born 1946), British bridge writer
- David Bird (journalist) (1959–2014), American financial journalist
- David John Bird (born 1946), dean of Trinity Episcopal Cathedral, San Jose

== See also ==
- Dave Bird (born 1984), English footballer
- David Burd (born 1988), American rapper better known as Lil Dicky
