= Deputy Secretary-General =

A Deputy Secretary-General is a deputy to a Secretary General.

Deputy Secretary-General may refer specifically to:

- United Nations Deputy Secretary-General
- Commonwealth Deputy Secretary-General
- Secretary General of NATO#Deputy Secretary General
