= Josephine Ojiambo =

Kenyan diplomat

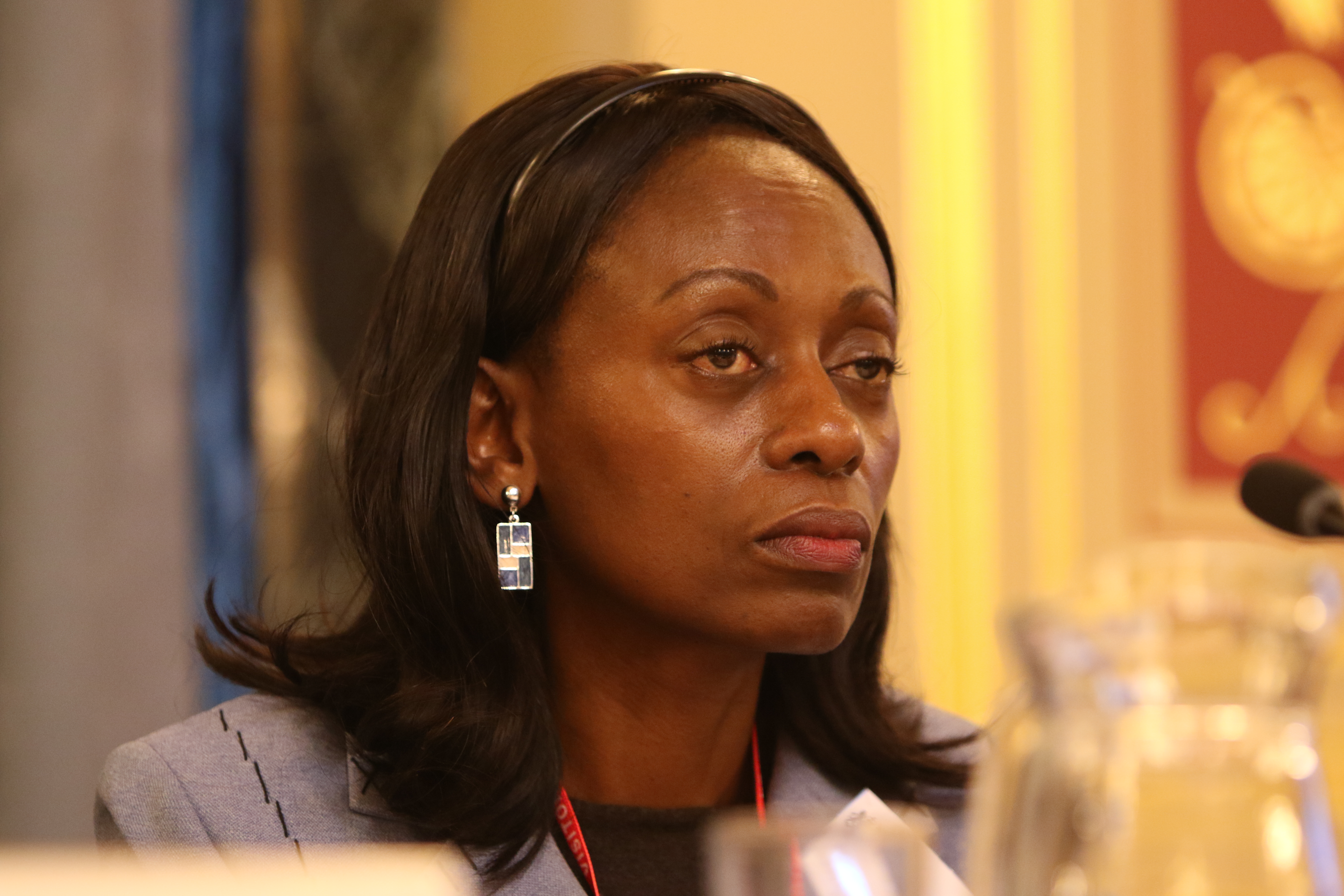
- in 2016
- Born: 1961 (age 64–65)
- Occupation: Diplomat
- Known for: Commonwealth Deputy Secretary-General

Josephine Ojiambo (born 1961) is a former Kenyan ambassador to the United Nations who served as a deputy secretary-general of the Commonwealth.

== Life ==
Ojiambo graduated in medicine and surgery and later took a masters degree in Community Medicine and Public Health. She led a Public Health Consultancy in Kenya.

She served within various ministries before she was appointed as the Kenyan ambassador to the United Nations. She was serving as the UN's Head of External Relations when she was recruited and appointed by Kamalesh Sharma as one

of the three deputy secretaries-general of the Commonwealth. She succeeded Mmasekgoa Masire-Mwamba. She expected to serve for two terms but at the end of the first term the concept of three deputies was abolished and her contract was not renewed. She sued and won a case for unfair dismissal. Moreover, her claim that she had been side-lined by the new secretary general, Patricia Scotland, was upheld.

In 2019, Ojiamo was involved with launching a Women Business Network chapter in Kenya to take up the "Commonwealth advantage". The scheme was running in other African countries like Malawi and South Africa. During the COVID-19 pandemic, she was Rotary's health focal point in Kenya and she was concerned that the lack of vaccinations in children that may lead to a return of polio.
