= Stretton Reeve =

Arthur Stretton Reeve (11 June 1907 – 27 January 1981) was Bishop of Lichfield from 1953 until 1 December 1974.

== Early life and education ==
Born into an ecclesiastical family, son of The Reverend Arthur Reeve and his wife Violet Inez Reeve was educated at Brighton College and Selwyn College, Cambridge. He rowed for the winning Cambridge eight in the 1930 Boat Race.

== Ecclesiastical career ==
Reeve's first post after ordination was as a curate in Putney (1930-32) after which he was Domestic Chaplain to Cyril Garbett as Bishop of Winchester (1932-36). Subsequently he was Vicar of Highfield, Hampshire (1936-43). From 1943 he was Vicar and Rural Dean of Leeds and an Honorary Canon of Ripon Cathedral (1947-53) before his elevation to the episcopate as Bishop of Lichfield in 1953.

Reeve also served as Chaplain to King George VI from 1945 to 1952 and to Queen Elizabeth II 1952 to 1953.

== Retirement ==
After retirement from the episcopacy Reeve lived at Huntington Green, Ashford Carbonell, Shropshire.

== Marriage and children ==
Reeve married Flora Montgomery McNeill in 1936, by whom he had a son and two daughters.

== Notes ==
Church of England titles
Preceded by Edward Sydney Woods	Bishop of Lichfield; 1953–1974	Succeeded by Kenneth John Fraser Skelton
