= Kgale Hill =

Hill in Gaborone, Botswana

- The Sleeping Giant
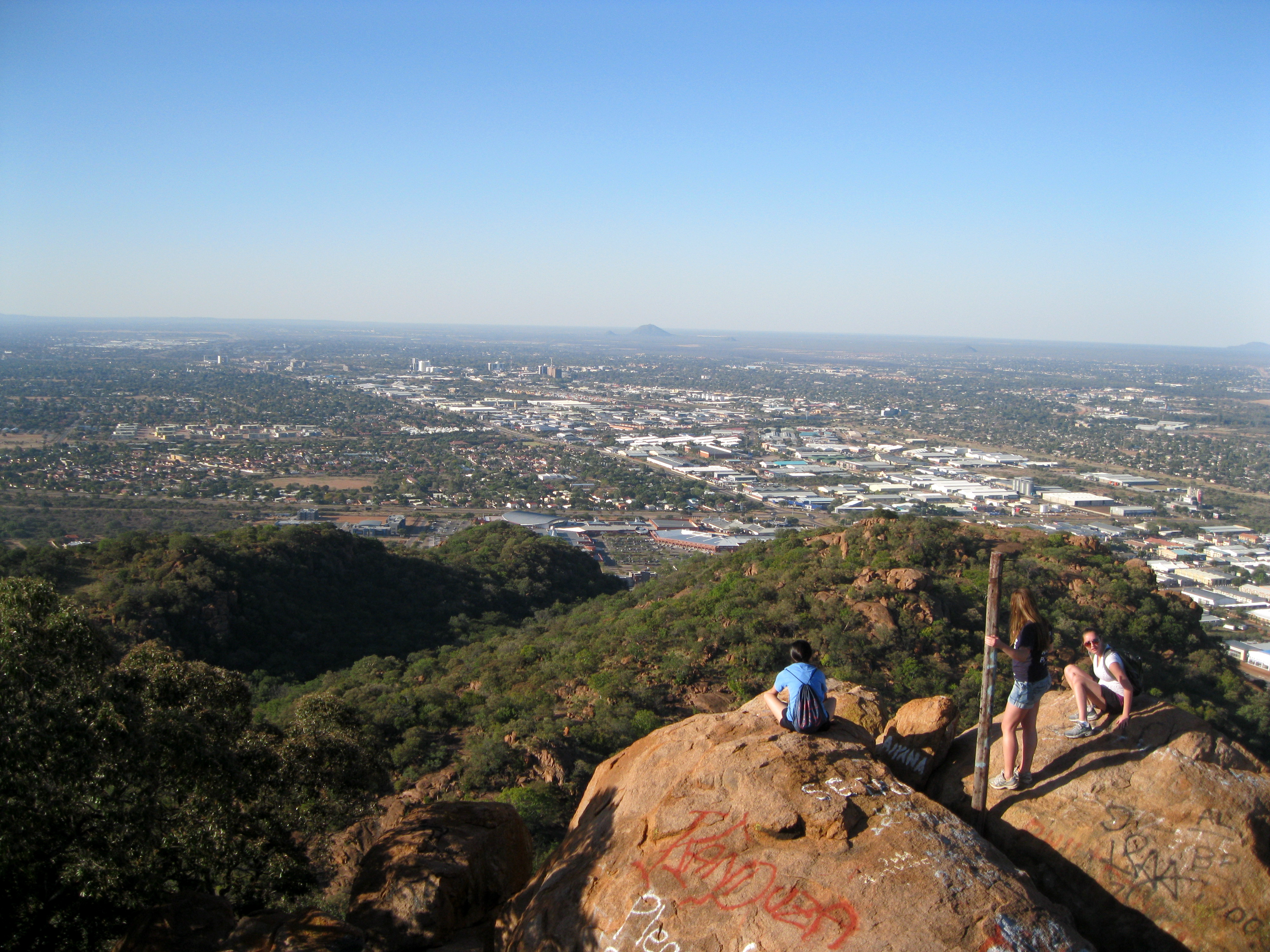
- View from the top overlooking Gaborone from the southeast in June 2011

Highest point
- Elevation: 1,287 m (4,222 ft)
- Coordinates: 24°41′45″S 25°52′04″E

Geography
- Location within Botswana
- Location: South-East District, Botswana

Climbing
- Easiest route: hike

Kgale Hill (Setswana for "The Place that Dried Up") is a hill located in Gaborone, Botswana. Nicknamed "The Sleeping Giant", Kgale Hill reaches a summit elevation of 1,287 metres (4,222 ft) above sea level. The hill used to be home to a television repeater and is now a tourist destination.

== Climbing and recreation ==
Hikers have a choice of three trails to climb to the peak. During the one-hour walk to the top, hikers can usually see troops of baboons.

The hill is the site of the PPC King of the Hill race, a collaboration between PPC Botswana and the Gaborone Runners Club. The 15 kilometres (9.3 mi) race begins at the PPC Botswana office, travels past Game City Mall, winds around the Kgale Quarry, climbs up the hill, and goes back to the PPC Botswana office.

== Cultural references ==
Filming for The No. 1 Ladies' Detective Agency took place at the foot of Kgale Hill, giving rise to the nickname "Kgalewood" for the set. The show's producers signed a ten-year lease for the area, and the Botswana government has invested US$5 million in the TV show in order to develop the set for tourism.

== Gallery ==
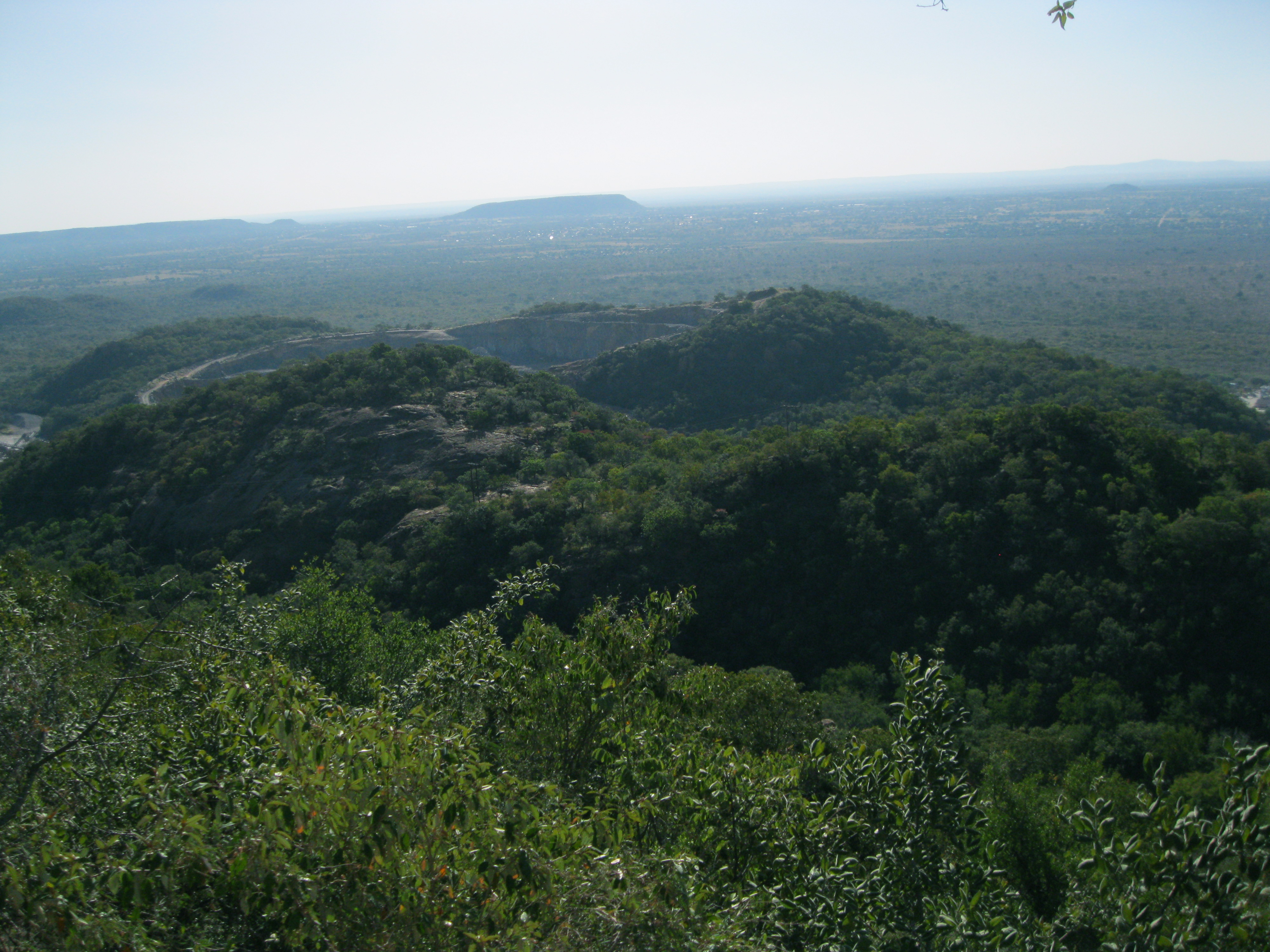

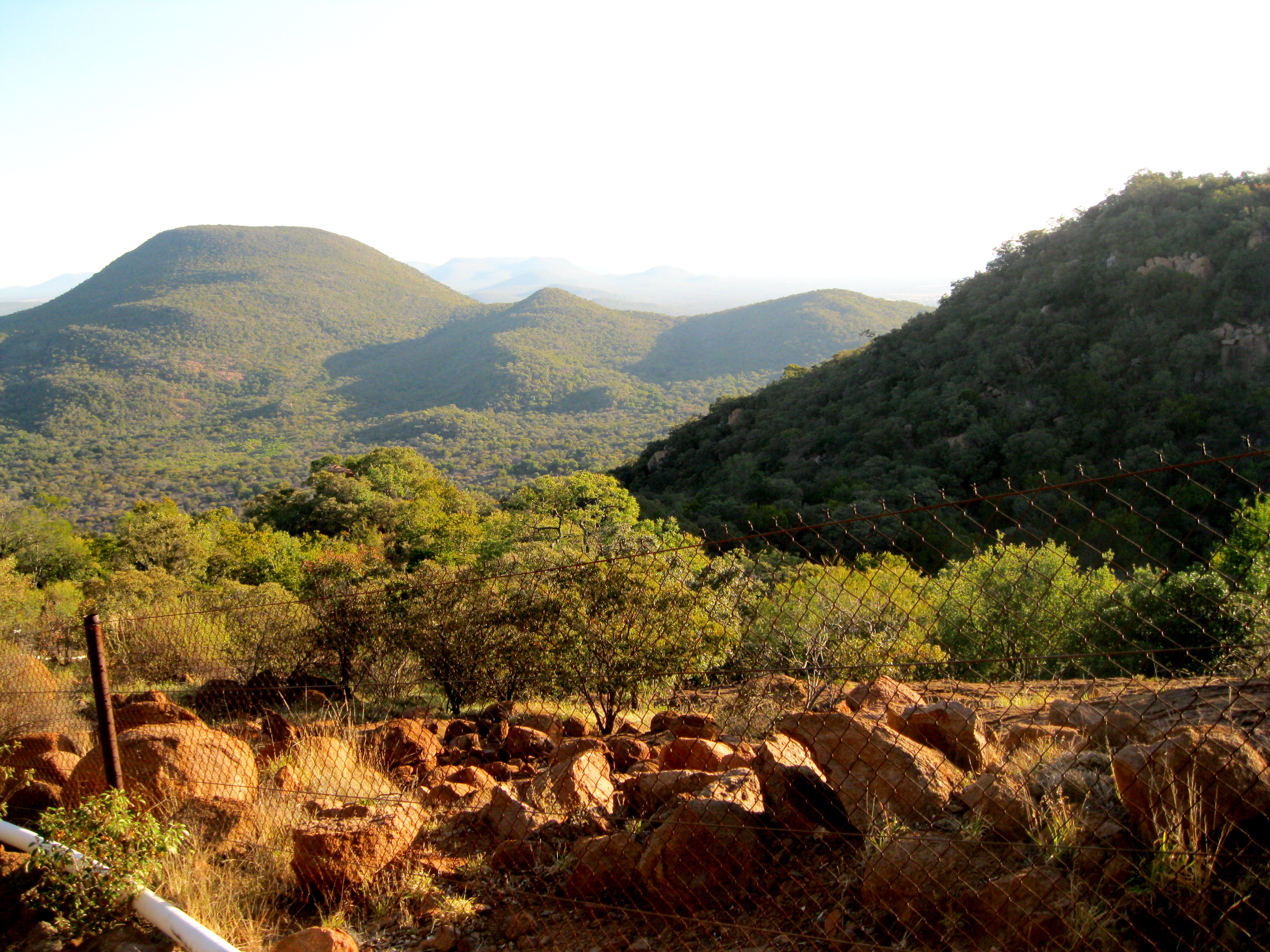

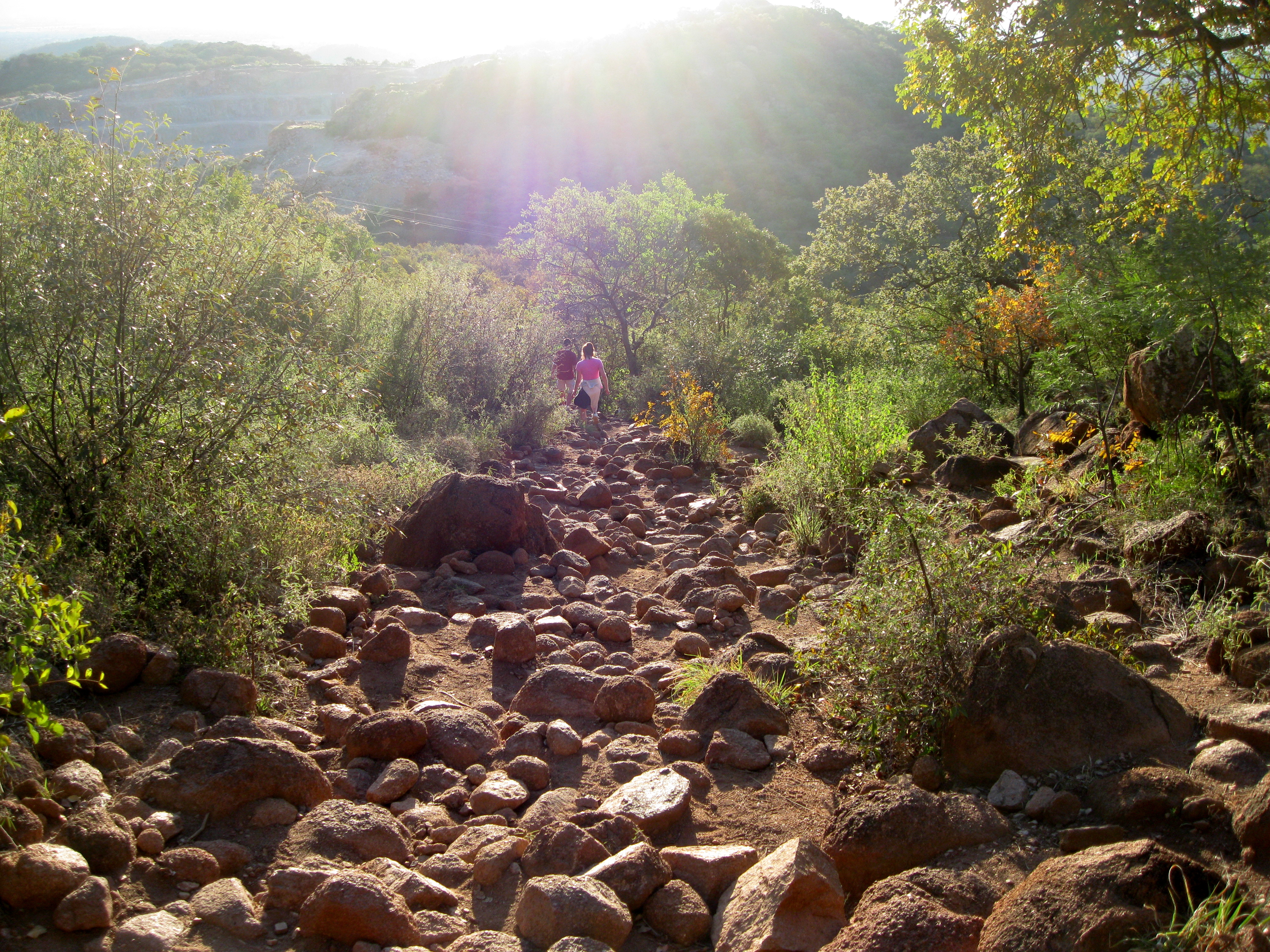
