= Episcopal Diocese of El Camino Real =

Diocese of the Episcopal Church in the United States

Diocese of El Camino Real

Location
- Country: United States
- Territory: Monterrey, San Benito, San Luis Obispo, Santa Clara, Santa Cruz
- Ecclesiastical province: Province VIII

Statistics
- Congregations: 40 (2024)
- Members: 5,760 (2023)

Information
- Denomination: Episcopal Church
- Established: June 20, 1980
- Cathedral: Trinity Cathedral

Current leadership
- Bishop: Lucinda Ashby

Map
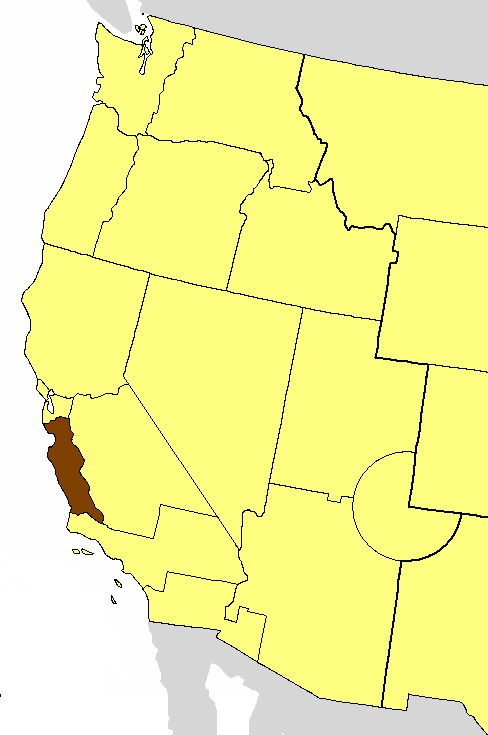
- Location of the Diocese of El Camino Real

Website
- www.realepiscopal.org

The Diocese of El Camino Real is a diocese of the Episcopal Church in the United States of America, located in northern and central California. The diocese includes the cities of San Jose (the see city), Monterey, Santa Cruz, and San Luis Obispo. The diocese includes all Episcopal congregations in the counties of Santa Clara (except for some in Los Altos and Palo Alto), Santa Cruz, San Benito, Monterey, and San Luis Obispo.

El Camino Real is a member of Province 8, which comprises 17 dioceses and the Navajoland Area Mission in the western United States. Diocesan offices are at the 1896-built B. V. Sargent House located at 154 Central Avenue, Salinas, California 93901.

Following the 2008 Lambeth Conference, the diocese established an informal triangular relationship with the Anglican Diocese of Gloucester in England and the Diocese of Western Tanganyika in Tanzania.

In 2024, the diocese reported average Sunday attendance (ASA) of 2,105 persons. The diocese reported 10,859 members in 2015 and 5,760 members in 2023. Plate and pledge financial support for 2024 was $7,715,896. No membership statistics were reported in 2024 parochial reports.

== History ==
The diocese, named for the historic El Camino Real, the King's Highway, was created from the Episcopal Diocese of California in 1980. While it is the youngest Episcopal diocese in California, El Camino Real's cathedral, Trinity Cathedral in San Jose, built in 1863, is the oldest Episcopal cathedral in the state.

Bishop Richard L. Shimpfky resigned in March 2004 and the diocese was administered from 2005 until 2007 by Assisting Bishop Sylvestre Romero-Palma, formerly the bishop of the Anglican Diocese of Belize.

On 10 November 2007, Mary Gray-Reeves was consecrated third bishop of the diocese. Elected 16 June 2007, Gray-Reeves, 44, was previously archdeacon for deployment for the Diocese of Southeast Florida. She is the 15th female Episcopal bishop and the 1,022nd bishop in the American succession.

On 11 January 2020, Lucinda Ashby was consecrated fourth bishop of the diocese, the second female bishop to succeed a female bishop in Episcopal Church history. Ashby had previously served as canon to the ordinary in the Diocese of Idaho, a position she held since 2011. She is the 1125th bishop in the American succession.

== Bishops of El Camino Real ==
1. C. Shannon Mallory (1980–1990)
2. Richard L. Shimpfky (1990–2004)
  * Sylvester Romero Palma (Assisting) (2005–2007)
3. Mary Gray-Reeves (2007-2020)
4. Lucinda Ashby (2020-present)

== See also ==
- List of Succession of Bishops for the Episcopal Church, USA
