= Wilson Sitshebo =

Wilson Timothy Sitshebo was the Anglican Bishop of Matabeleland until his death of a stroke in 2008. Born in 1952 and educated at St Bede’s College, Umtata, he was ordained deacon in 1979 and priest in 1980. After positions in Zimbabwe posts he was a tutor at the United College of the Ascension Selly Oak before his ordination to the episcopate in 2001. He was awarded a PhD in 2000 in the Faculty of Arts of the University of Birmingham for a dissertation titled "Towards a theological synthesis of Christian and Shona views of death and the dead: implications for pastoral care in the Anglican diocese of Harare, Zimbabwe."

== Notes ==
Anglican Communion titles
Preceded by Theo Naledi	Bishop of Matabeleland; 2001 – 2008	Succeeded by Cleophas Lunga
