= Trinity Episcopal Cathedral (San Jose, California) =

Episcopal Cathedral in San Jose, California

Trinity Cathedral
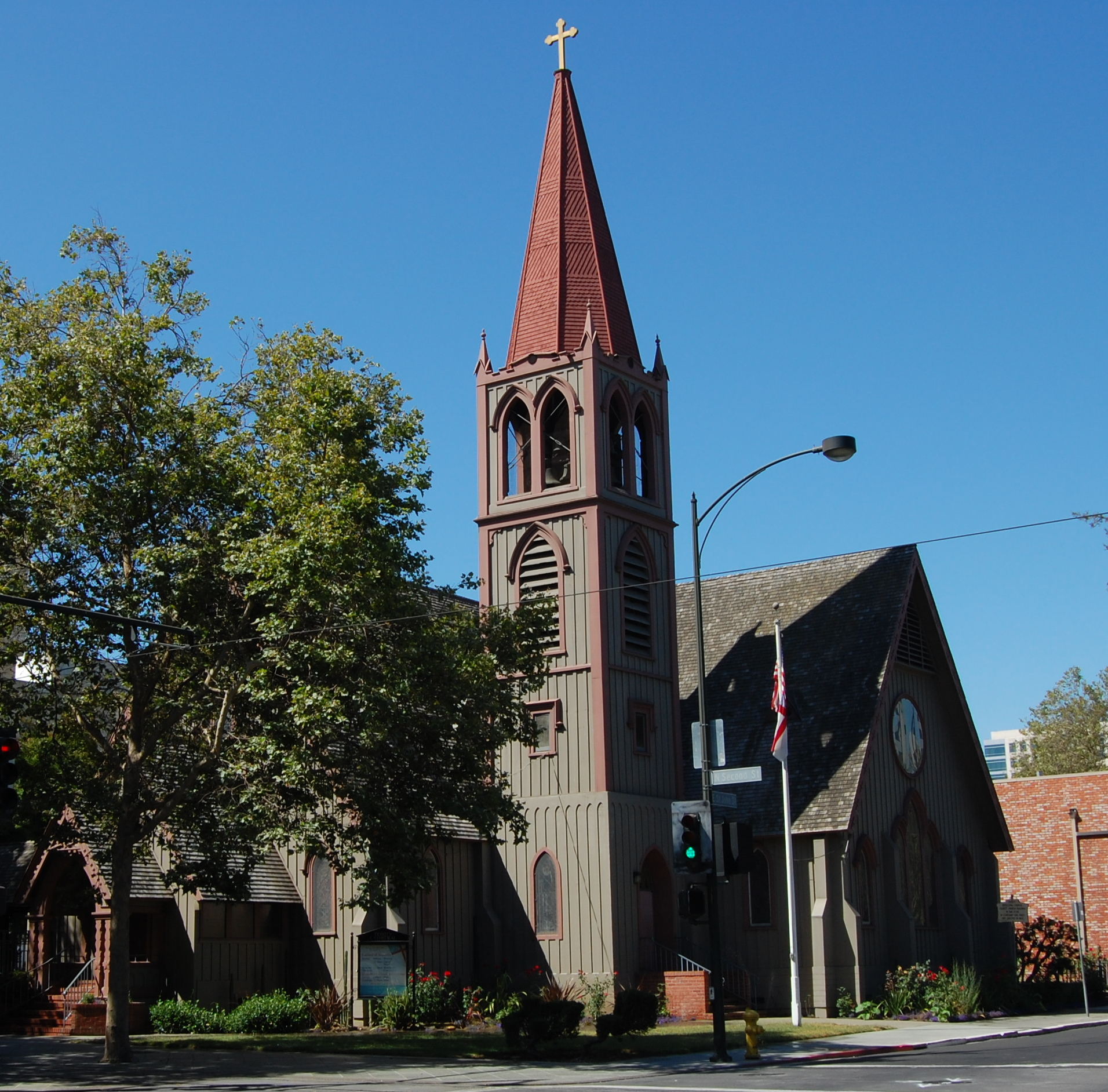
- Trinity Cathedral
- 37°20′16.17″N 121°53′26.87″W
- Location: 81 North Second Street; San Jose, California
- Country: United States
- Denomination: Episcopal Church in the United States of America
- Website: www.trinitysj.org

History
- Founded: 1861
- Consecrated: 1867

Architecture
- Architect: John W. Hammond
- Style: Carpenter Gothic
- Completed: 1863

Specifications
- Capacity: 408
- Materials: Redwood

Administration
- Diocese: El Camino Real

Clergy
- Bishop: Rt. Rev. Lucinda Ashby
- Dean: The Reverend Filemón Díaz, D.Min., Priest in Charge

Trinity Episcopal Cathedral is an Episcopal cathedral in San Jose, California. It is the seat of the Episcopal Diocese of El Camino Real.

In 2019, the church reported 772 members; in 2023, it reported 174 members. No membership statistics were reported in 2024 national parochial reports. Plate and pledge financial support reported by the church in 2024 was $264,667. Average Sunday Attendance (ASA) reported by the church in 2024 was 107 persons. This was a relative decrease from ASA of 198 persons reported in 2015.

== History ==
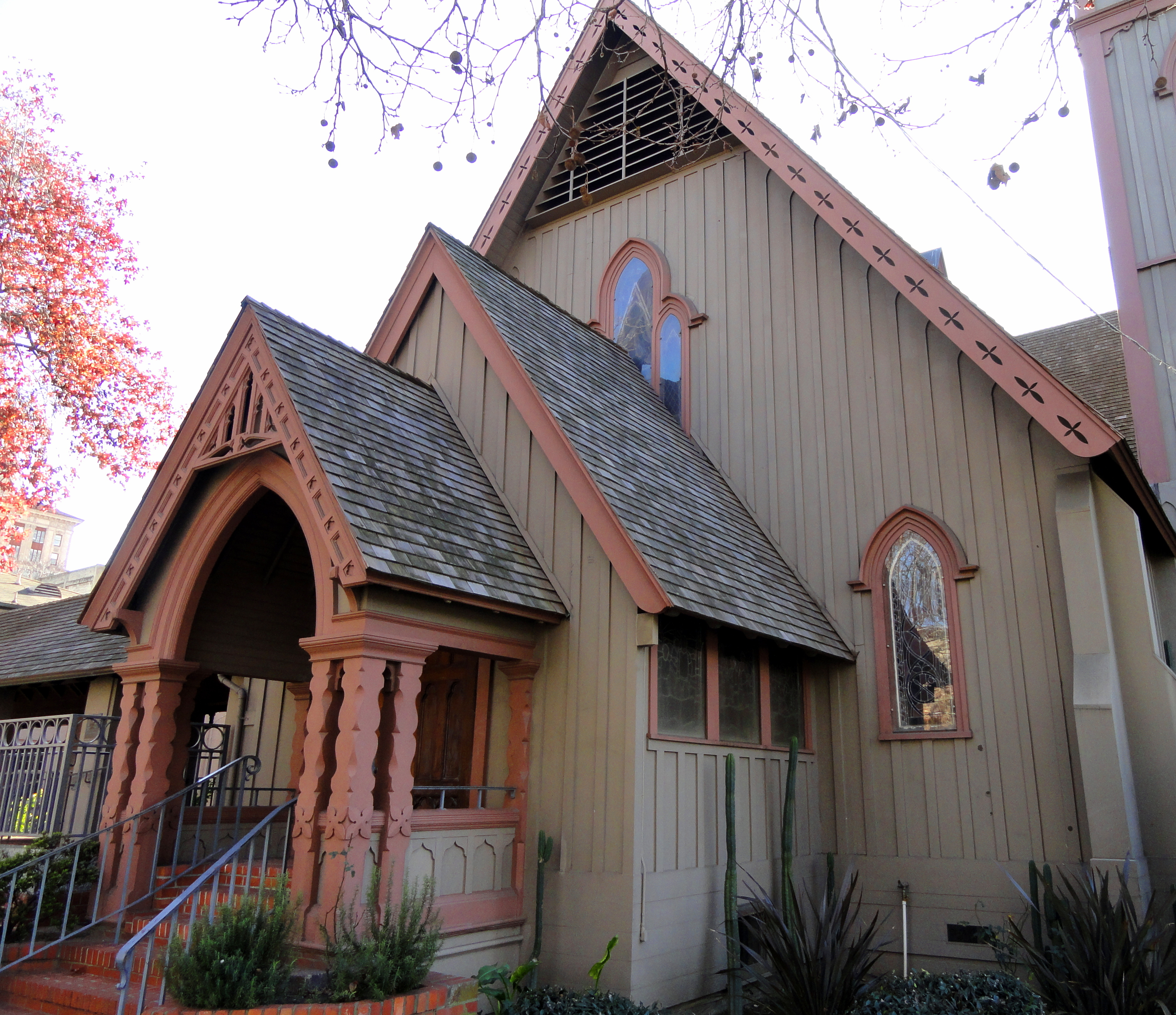
Entrance on 2nd Street.

San Jose was visited by the Right Rev. William Ingraham Kip shortly after he arrived in San Francisco in 1854 as the first Episcopal bishop of the Diocese of California. He conducted the city's first Episcopal service at the Independent Presbyterian Church (later renamed First Presbyterian Church). He visited San Jose occasionally until the Rev. Sylvester S. Etheridge arrived in late 1860. The following year the congregation organized itself as Trinity Church. Services were initially held in the firehouse on North Market Street and then in City Hall. The church building was completed in 1863 and consecrated by Bishop Kip four years later. Over the years, ten Episcopal congregations were formed from Trinity. The Diocese of El Camino Real was created from the Diocese of California in 1980, and Trinity was elevated to a cathedral church. Trinity Cathedral houses the oldest Episcopal congregation in San Jose; it is the oldest church building in continuous use in the city and is the oldest Episcopal cathedral church in California. In 2017, Trinity Cathedral completed a project that expanded its 18-bell chime to a 24-bell carillon, making it only the third carillon in the Bay Area, along with Stanford's Hoover Tower and UC Berkeley's Campanile

== Architecture ==
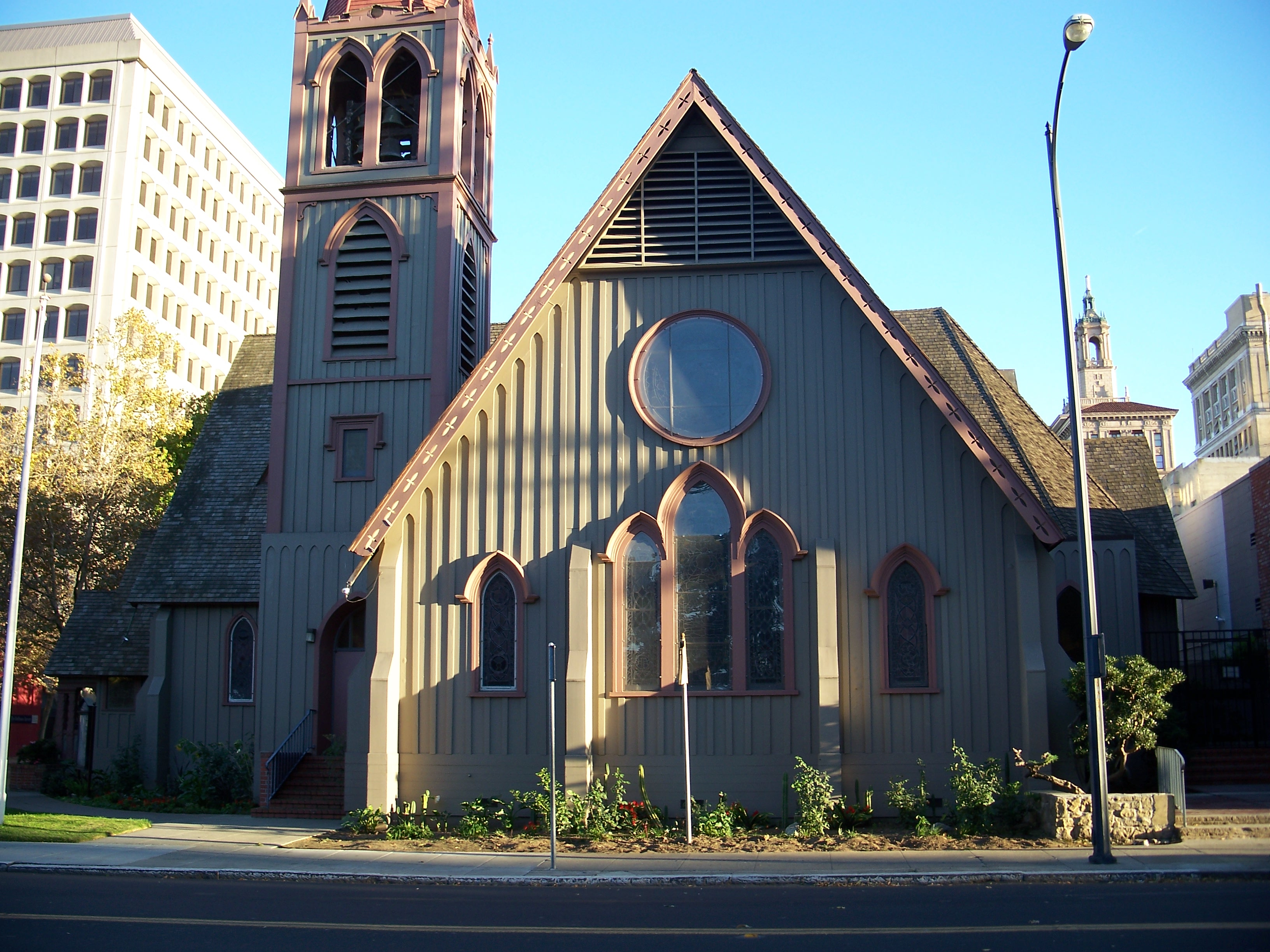
View from St. James Park.

The present church was designed by James W. Hammond, a retired sea captain and shipbuilder. He was also a member of Trinity's vestry. The building was rectangular in shape with a steep hipped roof. It was constructed of redwood that was logged in the Santa Cruz Mountains. As the congregation grew it became necessary to expand the building. Hammond devised a plan by which the church building was cut in half and pulled apart by a team of horses. The front was shifted to face North Second Street and additional arms were added to create a structure in the form of a cross. The bell tower was added at the same time. A spire was added to the tower in 1884. Renovations in 1958 brought the church to its present appearance.

== Hours ==
The Cathedral is open on Sundays from 10:00 AM to 2:00 PM, with services at 10:30 AM (English) and 1:00 PM (Spanish). The Cathedral's office hours are 11 AM to 3 PM Tuesdays, Wednesdays, and Thursdays.

== Rectors and Deans ==
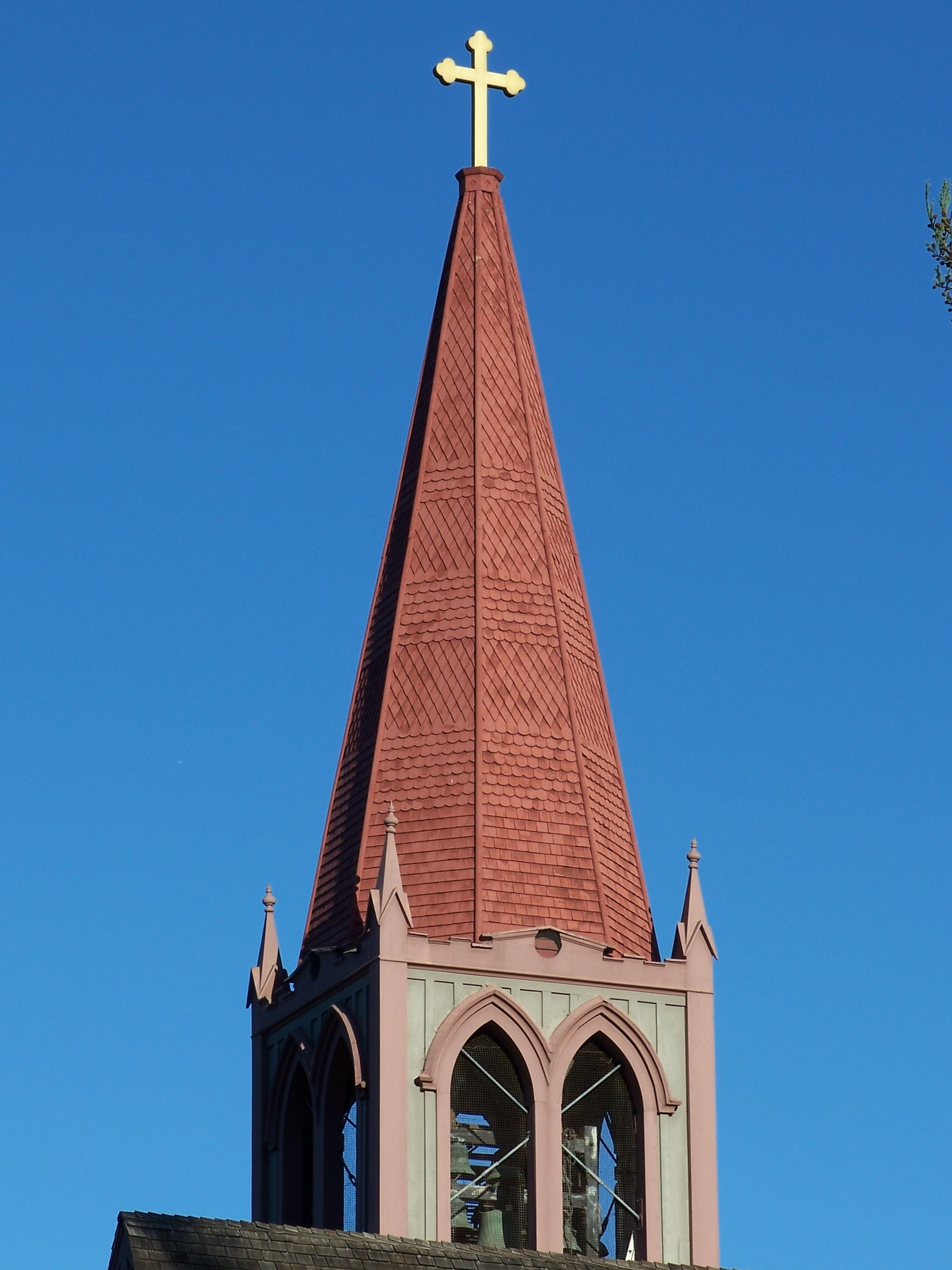
Detail of the bell tower.

The rectors of Trinity Cathedral have been:

1. Sylvester S. Etheridge (1861-1864)
2. Dinsmore D. Chapin (1864-1866)
3. Ebenezer S. Peake (1866-1870)
4. George W. Foote (1870-1884)
5. John B. Wakefield (1884-1899)
6. Barr Miller Weeden (1899-1901)
7. Charles H. Mockridge (1901-1902)
8. George W. Foote (1902-1903) Interim
9. J. Wilmer Gresham (1903-1911)
10. Halsey Werlein Jr. (1911-1917)
11. A. W. Noel Porter (1917-1925)
12. Mark Rifenbark (1925-1956)
13. William Barton Murdoch (1956-1979)
14. David Albert Cooling (1980-1985)
15. G. Richard Millard (1985-1988) Interim
16. William Power Clancey (1988-1991)
17. Philip A. Getchell (1991-1999)
18. Ann Winsor (1999-2000)
19. Armand H. Kreft (2000)
20. James McLeod (Interim)
21. Nikolous Merrell (Interim)
22. Richard Lief (Interim)
23. David Bird (2003-Jan. 2019)
24. Julia McCray-Goldsmith (2019 - 2024)
25. Filemón Díaz (2025 - Present) Priest in Charge

== See also ==
- List of the Episcopal cathedrals of the United States
- List of cathedrals in the United States
