= Richard L. Shimpfky =

American bishop

The Right Reverend Richard L. Shimpfky
- Bishop of El Camino Real
- Church: Episcopal Church
- Diocese: El Camino Real
- Elected: 1990
- In office: 1990-2004
- Successor: C. Shannon Mallory
- Opposed to: Mary Gray-Reeves

Orders
- Ordination: June 20, 1970 (deacon); June 1, 1971 (priest) by Philip Alan Smith
- Consecration: September 8, 1990 by Edmond L. Browning

Personal details
- Born: October 18, 1940 Albuquerque, New Mexico, United States
- Died: February 28, 2011 (aged 70) Ridgewood, New Jersey, United States
- Parents: Henry Lester Shimpfky & Thelma Louise Brazelton
- Spouse: Jamel Shimpfky (m. 1966)
- Children: 3

Richard Lester Shimpfky (October 18, 1940 – February 28, 2011) was second bishop of the Episcopal Diocese of El Camino Real from 1990 to 2004.

== Early life ==
Shimpfky was born on October 18, 1940, in Albuquerque, New Mexico, the son of Henry Lester Shimpfky (1914-2001) and Thelma Louise Brazelton (1912-2009). He graduated from the University of Colorado in 1963 where he was a member of the Sigma Phi Epsilon (SigEp) Fraternity.

In 1963 he joined the headquarters staff of the SigEp Fraternity, first as a traveling staff representative and then as the Director of Chapter Services, the number two professional management position. Staying in this job until 1967 when he was called to the religious life of the Episcopal Church. He credited much of his outlook on helping and interacting with others on his college and professional experience with Sigma Phi Epsilon Fraternity whose motto is "Virtue, Diligence, and Brotherly Love."

== Ordained ministry ==
Attending the Virginia Theological Seminary in Alexandria, Virginia, he was ordained deacon on June 20, 1970, and a priest June 1, 1971, by Philip Alan Smith, suffragan bishop of Virginia. He served as curate at St Peter's Church in Arlington, Virginia, between 1970 and 1972. He then became vicar of All Saints' Sharon Chapel in Alexandria, Virginia, from 1972 to 1973 and then rector of the same church until 1977 when he was appointed rector of Christ Church in Ridgewood, New Jersey, where he remained until 1990.

== Episcopacy ==
In 1990 he was elected Bishop of the Diocese of El Camino Real which stretched from San Luis Obispo to Silicon Valley in California. He was consecrated on September 8, 1990, with Presiding Bishop Edmond L. Browning as chief consecrator. The Sigma Phi Epsilon Fraternity presented Bishop Shimpfky with the SigEp Citation in recognition for his life-long involvement and contributions. He was nominated for the post of U.S. Presiding Bishop in 2002. Resigning from his post in 2004, he moved back to New Jersey. He served in the Diocese of Newark and the Diocese of Long Island, returning to Christ Church in Short Hills, New Jersey when terminally ill. He died at the age of 70 in February 2011.
