= David John Bird =

British Anglican priest

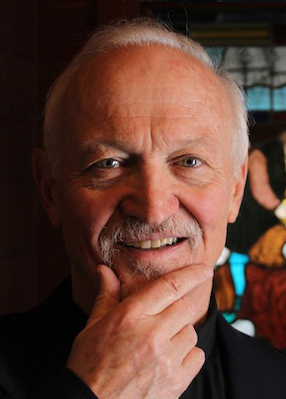
Photograph of David John Bird, 2015.

David John Bird (born 16 December 1946) is dean emeritus of the historic Trinity Episcopal Cathedral, the oldest church structure in continuous use in San Jose. He is a parish priest who reads and writes poetry and is particularly fond of Alfred Lord Tennyson. As a theologian, he emphasizes a liberal, compassionate, and inclusive approach and is devoted to ecumenism. Bird promotes Christian unity and is published in this field; since 2002, he has served on the national Committee of The Episcopal Church-United Methodist Church Dialogue.

== Early life ==
Bird was born in the village of Dorridge in the borough of Solihull in Warwickshire. His father, John Dawson Bird, was a bank manager and sergeant major in the Royal Artillery; his mother, Winifred, was a music teacher, who worked in the Ministry of Labor during the war and was a nurse. He attended Royal Grammar School Worcester from 1957 to 1965. The Rt. Rev. Mervyn Charles-Edwards, Bishop of Worcester, ordained him deacon on 29 March 1970 at St. George's Church, Kidderminster, and the Rt. Rev. Sir Robert Wilmer Woods as priest the following year. Dr. Bird is married to Diane, a mechanical engineer, and they have two children, Michael and Alexandra.

== Academic life ==
Bird earned his B.A. in English literature, biblical studies, and theology at St. David's College, Lampeter, Wales (today University of Wales, Lampeter) from 1965 to 1970. During this time, he was a student at Bishop Burgess Hall, the theological college for ordination training. He earned a Master of Sacred Theology at General Theological Seminary, New York (1972–74). His Ph.D. is in systematic theology and ethics, with an emphasis on ecumenism from Duquesne University, Pittsburgh, Pa. (1982–87).

He served as chaplain and chair of the Department of Religion, Trinity School (New York City), from 1973 to 1978. Dr. Bird joined the faculty in theology at Duquesne University (1988–89) before assisting at the College of Preachers, Washington, D.C., 2000-2003, as an adjunct. He functioned in the capacity of seminarian supervisor at Virginia Theological Seminary (1989-2003), and at Church Divinity School of the Pacific, Berkeley, Ca. (2003 to present).

== Clerical life ==
Bird was curate at St. George's Church, Kidderminster, England, (1970–72) and associate at Christ and St. Stephen's Church, New York (1977–78). He was appointed vicar of Christ Episcopal Church, Rochdale, Ma., (1978–79), and then as rector at St. Andrew's Church, New Kensington, Pa., (1979–89), now closed. He was on the committee, Episcopalian and Roman Catholic Diocesan Ecumenical Officers (1988–93), and from 1988 to 1989, was canon theologian in the Diocese of Pittsburgh, where he was also associate ecumenical officer (1984–89) and chair of the board of examining chaplains (1988–89).

The next year he became rector at Grace Church, Georgetown, Washington, D.C. (1989-2003); meanwhile, he was reader of General Ordination Examinations in the Diocese of Washington (1991-2003), co-chaired the Washington Diocese Medical Ethics Committee (1997–99), and was theological consultant for Bishop Walter Righter’s defense brief (1996). He has served as dean and rector of the historic Trinity Cathedral, San Jose, Ca. (2003 to the present). During this time, he was visitor and chaplain of the College of Early Christian Studies (2013 to present).

== Publications and contributions ==
- Models of Ecumenism. (Chicago: National Ecumenical Consultation, 1987).
- Liberal Theology: A Tradition in the Church, Mission and Ministry, 6, 2 (1988).
- A Plea for the Voiceless: The Child, the Reshaped Family and the Church. Mission and Ministry, 6, 4 (1989).
- Terminal Illness and Assisted Suicide: Medical and Christian Moral Perspective. Cathedral Papers, 6 (Washington National Cathedral, 1993).
- Receiving the Vision: The Anglican Roman Catholic Reality Today (Liturgical Press: Collegeville, MN., 1995).
- Before You Need Them, (Forward Movement Press, 1995).
- Assisted Suicide and Euthanasia: Christian Moral Perspectives. "The Washington Report," Committee on Medical Ethics, Episcopal Diocese of Washington, D.C. (Morehouse Barlow, 1997).
- Toward a Good Christian Death (Morehouse Barlow, 1999).
- Serving Unity (EDEO-NADEO Standing Committee, 2000).
- Make Us One with Christ, an official report presented to the Episcopal Church and the United Methodist Church (2006).
- Paper on the current state of relationship between the Church of England and the British Methodist bodies presented to the Episcopal Church-United Methodist Church Dialogue (2007).
- Bird, David (2008). "Rome and Canterbury: The Elusive Search for Unity (review)". The Catholic Historical Review. 94 (4): 744–745. doi:10.1353/cat.0.0257. S2CID 161602388. Project MUSE 252922.
- Two papers presented to the National Workshop on Christian Unity on the current state of the Episcopal Church-United Methodist Church dialog, 2009.
- Noel A. Davies, A History of Ecumenism in Wales, 1956-1990 (review), Journal of Ecumenical Studies, Vol. 45, 2010.

== Community service ==
From 1992 to 2003 Bird was a member of the Institutional Review Board for the National Institute on Alcohol Abuse and Alcoholism as well as the National Institutes of Health, Bethesda, Md. (1989-2003), where he served as ethics advisor regarding experimental medical protocols on patients. While rector, he was on the board at the Georgetown Ministry Center's Mission, and he housed it at Grace Church. Dr. Bird served in the capacity of independent ethics advisor for the Institutional Review Board, Clinical Trials and Surveys Corporation, Baltimore, Md. (1993-2015) and at the Institutional Review Board, National Institute on Alcohol Abuse and Alcoholism, National Institutes of Health (1992-2003).

He has served as chaplain to several organizations, including Single Caring Parents, Alle Kiski Valley, New Kensington, Pa. (as well as coordinator, 1981–84) and the Fraternal Order of Police, Pa., Lodge 39 (1986–89). Dr. Bird was a founding member of the Alle Kiski Valley Task Force on AIDS (1988), with the intent of opening the doors of traditional churches to those who contracted the infection. He remains an active member of Rotary International (1979–87, 2013 to present), where he raises funds for social causes and makes the plight of the homeless, the unemployed, and the unfortunate known. This is a consistent element in his ministry.
