= Diocese of Matabeleland =

The Diocese of Matabeleland is in Zimbabwe. It is one of 15 dioceses of the Province of Central Africa, a province of the Anglican Communion. The diocese was constituted in 1953 and originally also contained Botswana.

== List of Bishops ==
Bishops of Matabeleland
From	Until	Incumbent	Notes
1951	1958	James Hughes	First Bishop of Matabeleland; Translated to Trinidad
1958	1966	Kenneth Skelton	Became Assistant Bishop in the Diocese of Durham; later Bishop of Lichfield
1966	1971	?No Appointment	Political situation in Rhodesia unsettled 1965–1970
1971	1977	Mark Wood	Became Assistant Bishop in the Diocese of Hereford; later Bishop of Ludlow
1977	1987	Robert Mercer	
1987	2000	Theo Naledi	Translated to Botswana
2001	2008	Wilson Sitshebo	Died in office
2009	2026	Cleophas Lunga	Translated to St Laurence Catford, Diocese of Southwark as Vicar
