= Robert Mercer (priest) =

Roman Catholic priest in England

The Reverend Monsignor Robert Mercer
- Church: Roman Catholic Church
- See: Personal Ordinariate of Our Lady of Walsingham
- Other posts: Bishop of Matabeleland (Anglican; 1977–1987); Metropolitan Bishop of Canada (ACCC; 1988-2005)

Orders
- Ordination: 1959 (Anglican); 17 March 2012 (RCC)
- Consecration: 1977 (Anglican)

Personal details
- Born: 10 January 1935 (age 91)
- Denomination: Roman Catholic (formerly Anglican)
- Education: Port Elizabeth and St Paul's Theological College

Robert William Stanley Mercer CR (born 10 January 1935) is a Roman Catholic priest in England. Formerly an Anglican bishop, he was the fourth Bishop of Matabeleland in Zimbabwe, a diocese of the Church of the Province of Central Africa, a province of the Anglican Communion. Since 2012 he has been a priest in the Personal Ordinariate of Our Lady of Walsingham, a personal ordinariate for former Anglicans within the Roman Catholic Church in the United Kingdom.

== Early life and education ==
Mercer was educated at Grey High School, Port Elizabeth and St Paul’s Theological College, Grahamstown.

== Ordained ministry ==
=== Anglican ===
Ordained as a deacon in 1959 and as a priest a year later, his first post was as a curate at Hillside, Bulawayo. After time at St Teilo’s Carmarthen, he returned to his homeland.

In 1970, he was deported from South Africa because of his stand against apartheid, specifically for running, with other Anglican clerics, a multi-racial parish at Stellenbosch University. He was then chaplain of St Augustine's School, Penhalonga and then rector of Borrowdale, Harare.

Mercer was ordained as a bishop in Matabeleland in 1977 and served in the midst of a civil war. From 1988 until his retirement in 2005 he was the metropolitan bishop of the Anglican Catholic Church of Canada. Though retired to England, he remained a member of the Anglican Catholic Church of Canada's house of bishops until January 2012.

=== Roman Catholic ===
On 7 January 2012, Mercer was received into the Roman Catholic Church as a member of the Personal Ordinariate of Our Lady of Walsingham at St Agatha's Church, Landport. On 27 March 2012, he was ordained a Catholic priest by Bishop Alan Hopes in the Cathedral of St John the Evangelist, Portsmouth. On 21 June 2012 it was announced that he had been elevated to the rank of Chaplain of His Holiness, entitling him to the title of monsignor.

Despite becoming an ordained member of the Roman Catholic Church, Mercer continues to be a member of the Anglican Community of the Resurrection and to live in accommodation in Worthing purchased for him by that community.

Religious titles
Preceded by Stanley Mark Wood	Bishop of Matabeleland; 1977–1987	Succeeded by Theo Naledi
Preceded by ?	Metropolitan Bishop of Canada; 1988–2005	Succeeded by Peter Wilkinson
