= Mary Gray-Reeves =

The Right Reverend Mary Gray-Reeves M.Div.
- Bishop of El Camino Real
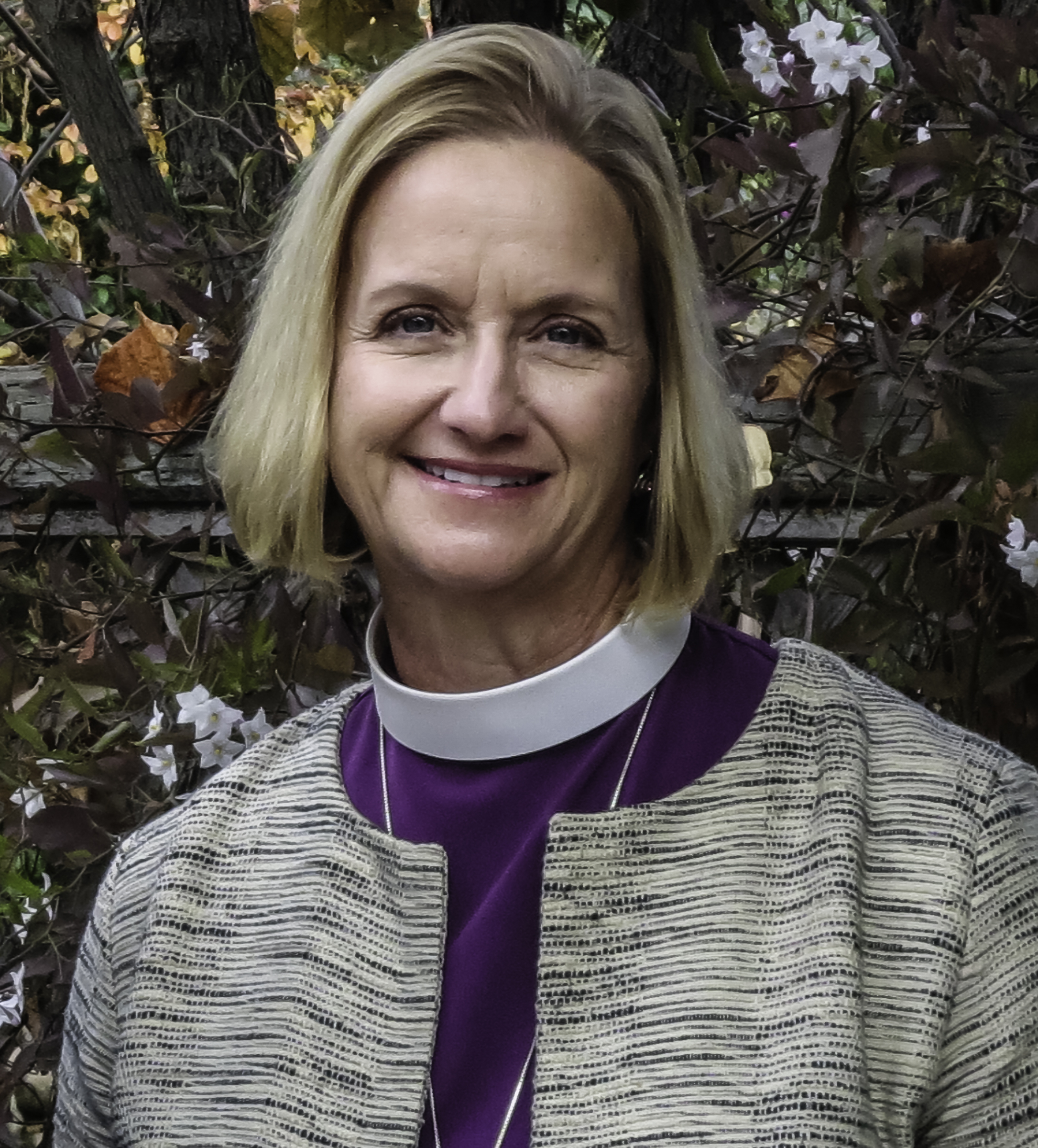
- Bishop Gray-Reeves in 2019
- Church: Episcopal Church
- Diocese: El Camino Real
- Elected: 2007
- In office: 2007–2020
- Predecessor: Richard L. Shimpfky
- Successor: Lucinda Ashby

Orders
- Ordination: 1994 (deacon); 1995 (priest)
- Consecration: November 10, 2007 by Katharine Jefferts Schori

Personal details
- Born: July 5, 1962 (age 63) Coral Gables, Florida, United States
- Denomination: Anglican
- Spouse: Michael Reeves (d. 2014)

Mary Gray-Reeves (born July 5, 1962) was the third bishop of the Episcopal Diocese of El Camino Real.

== Early life and education ==
Mary Gray-Reeves was born in Coral Gables, Florida, in 1962 and grew up in the Miami neighborhood of Coconut Grove, where she attended St. Stephen's Episcopal Church. After high school, she attended California State University, Fullerton, from which she received a Bachelor of Arts degree in history in 1987. After her decision to seek holy orders, she and her husband, Michael Reeves, went to New Zealand because she could attend theological school at St John's College, Auckland, while he could attend to his business which involved much travel in the western Pacific. In 1994 she graduated from St John's and received the equivalent of the American Master of Divinity degree.

== Career ==
After she and her husband returned to California, she was ordained deacon and then priest in the Episcopal Diocese of Los Angeles. After being assistant rector of two churches in that diocese, she and her husband returned to the Miami area where she became rector of St. Margaret's Episcopal Church in Miami Lakes. After six years at St. Margaret's she was appointed archdeacon for deployment for the Episcopal Diocese of Southeast Florida. On June 16, 2007, the Diocese of El Camino Real at convention in Monterey elected Mary Gray-Reeves its third bishop. She was consecrated on November 10, 2007.

At the 2008 meeting of the Lambeth Conferences of the Anglican Communion, Bishops Mary Gray-Reeves of El Camino Real, Michael Perham of Gloucester, and Gerard Mpango of Western Tanganyika formed a partnership of their dioceses. This successful companion diocese relationship has resulted in an annual round of visits between the bishops and delegations to each other's home countries and the 2011 book The Hospitality of God by Mary Gray-Reeves and Michael Perham. On 30 June 2010, the three bishops wrote a joint letter to Rowan Williams, then Archbishop of Canterbury, about what they were learning. In 2010, Bishop Sadock Makaya succeeded Bishop Gerard Mpango in the partnership.

On March 15, 2018, Bishop Mary Gray-Reeves announced her intention to end her ministry as Bishop of El Camino Real on January 11, 2020.

== Family ==
Mary Gray-Reeves and her late husband, Michael Reeves, have two children, Katherine and Dorian.

== See also ==
- List of Episcopal bishops of the United States
- Historical list of the Episcopal bishops of the United States
