= Ransford Smith =

Jamaican diplomat

His Excellency Ransford Smith CD

Deputy Secretary-General for Economic Affairs and Development
- Incumbent
- Assumed office August 2006
- Head: Elizabeth II
- Secretary-General: Kamalesh Sharma
- Preceded by: Winston Cox

Chairperson of the Committee on Trade and Development of the World Trade Organization
- In office 2000–2001

President of the Trade and Development Board at the United Nations Conference on Trade and Development
- In office 2005–2006

Personal details
- Born: 23 July 1949 (age 76) Jamaica
- Profession: Diplomat, Civil Servant

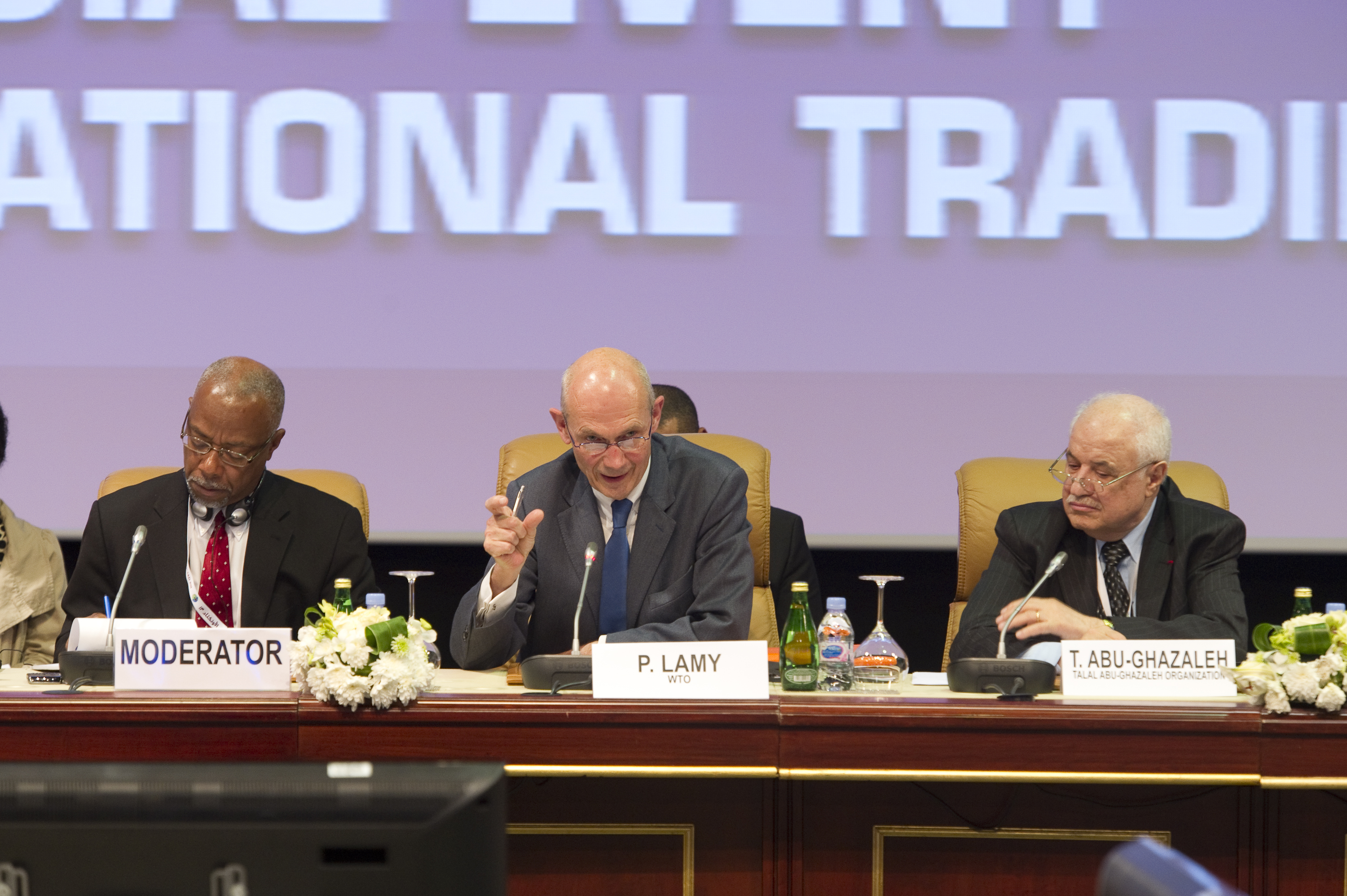
Ransford Smith (at left) at UNCTAD XIII

Ransford Smith, CD (born 23 July 1949), is a senior public servant from Jamaica. He was the Deputy Secretary-General for Economic Affairs and Development of the Commonwealth of Nations from 2006 to 2013.

A career diplomat of nearly 30 years standing in the Jamaican Public and Foreign Service, Smith previously served as Permanent Secretary to the Ministry of Commerce and Technology, and also Permanent Secretary to the Ministry of Industry and Investment. His diplomatic career has included postings at the Jamaican Embassy in Washington, D.C., and the Jamaican Mission to the United Nations in New York.

Smith is the first Jamaican to serve as a Commonwealth Deputy-Secretary General. He was the Permanent Representative of Jamaica to the Office of the United Nations and its specialised agencies in Geneva, Rome and Vienna. Mr Smith was also Ambassador of Jamaica to the World Trade Organisation (WTO), and served as Ambassador to a number of European countries.

He has extensive experience of participation in multilateral economic and development bodies. He was Chairman of the WTO Committee on Trade and Development (2000–01), Chairman of the Commonwealth Group of Developing Countries in Geneva (2001–02), and President of the Trade and Development Board of the United Nations Conference on Trade and Development (UNCTAD) (2005–06).

He has led Jamaican delegations to international conferences, including the Doha Ministerial Conference of the WTO. He was also Chief Negotiator and Spokesperson for the Group of 77 and China at UNCTAD XI in June 2004.

Smith has an MA in International Relations and an MBA in Financial Management. He was appointed a Commander of the Order of Distinction in Jamaica for outstanding service in Foreign Affairs in 2005.

== Footnote ==
- Biography on the Commonwealth Secretariat's official website

The Commonwealth Secretariat have given permission for this biography to be used on Wikipedia.

- Statement by Mr Smith at The High Level Plenary Meeting of the General Assembly on the Millennium Development Goals. United Nations, New York, 22 September 2010.
- Statement of the President of the Trade and Development Board, H.E. Ambassador Ransford Smith (Jamaica), to the Special High-Level Meeting with the Bretton Woods Institutions, WTO and UNCTAD.
