= Mmasekgoa Masire-Mwamba =

Botswanan administrator (born 1960)

The Right Honourable Mmasekgoa Masire-Mwamba GCVO CFR CON
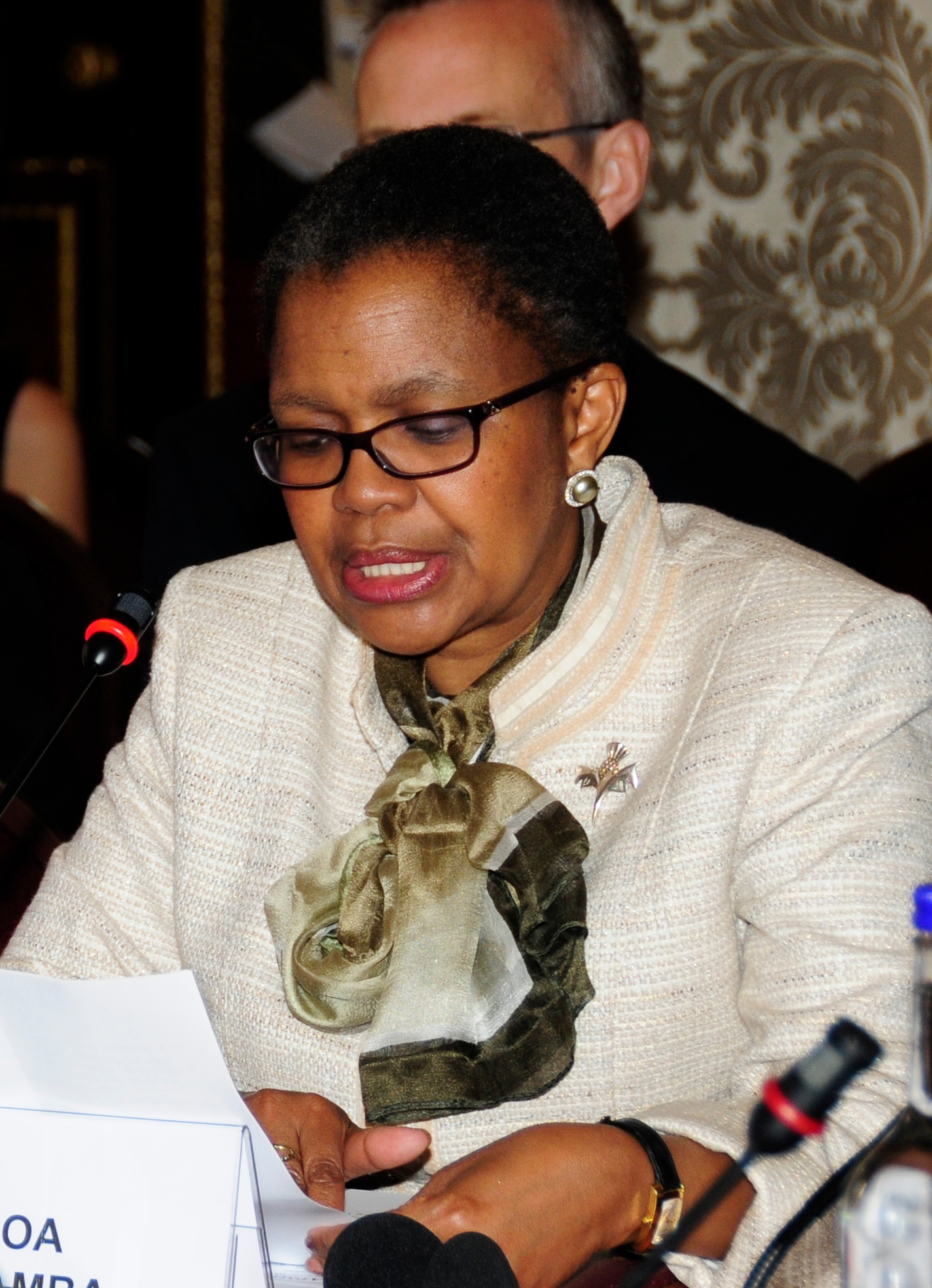
- Masire-Mwamba in 2012

3rd Secretary-General of the Commonwealth of Nations

Commonwealth Deputy Secretary-General
- In office 2008–2014

Mmasekgoa Masire-Mwamba is a Botswana administrator and an international civil servant, with over 30 years senior-level experience in the fields of business, development and multilateral diplomacy. Mmasekgoa Masire-Mwamba was the Commonwealth Deputy Secretary-General from 2008 to 2014.

== Background and education ==
Masire-Mwamba was born Gabaipone Masire on 7 March 1960, Kanye to parents - Ketumile Quett Joni and Gladys Olebile Masire and grew up in Gaborone where she started her schooling Thornhill Primary School. The name Gabaipone was given to her in honor of her father's mother Gabaipone. With such a big name one usually adopts a substitute, Mmasekgoa; which for her, it ended up overshadowing her real name.

She was then admitted to the University of London graduating with a Bachelor of Science electronics and physics major. In 1990 she obtained a Masters of Business Administration (MBA) from the University of Pittsburgh. Masire-Mwamba holds a Bachelor of Law degree (LLB) from University of South Africa, UNISA and an Advanced Management Diploma from IESE Business School, Spain. She is a certified executive coach and trainer, having established a private company offering soft skills training focusing on Leadership Accountability and Board Governance.

Masire-Mwamba was the first Motswana Chief-Executive Officer at the Botswana Export Development and Investment Authority (BEDIA), Botswana's national Investment Promotion Agency.

In 2009, she has been recognised in the legal field by the Honourable Society of Middle Temple Inn awarding her Honorary Bencher.

In November 2015, she came second to Patricia Scotland from Dominica in the voting to become Commonwealth Secretary-General, losing by 26 votes to 24. She was awarded an International Women in Leadership by Dr. Long, at the London Political Summit in 2018 and has served as the President for Botswana Women in Business.

== Personal life ==
Masire-Mwamba is married to Trevor Mwamba, formerly Bishop of Botswana and formerly Rector of Barking, East London. She has three children.

== Recognition ==
She was recognized as one of the BBC's 100 women of 2013.
