= Cleophas Lunga =

The Right Reverend Cleophas Lunga is a prominent Zimbabwean Anglican prelate who served as the Bishop of the Diocese of Matabeleland from March 2009 until September 2026. In early 2026, it was announced that he would transition to a new ministry role in the United Kingdom as the Vicar of St Laurence, Catford in the Diocese of Southwark. His local farewell service in Matabeleland was held on 17 September 2026. He was born in Bulawayo in 1966.

== Career ==
He was educated in Roman Catholic schools and was temporarily employed by the Catholic Church but joined the local Anglican Church in 1986. He worked as a clerk in a legal office for three years before pursuing theological studies at Bishop Gaul Theological College, Harare. He was ordained deacon in 1993 and posted to St Andrew's in Bulawayo.

The following year he was made a priest and assigned to the Cathedral in Bulawayo as assistant priest and diocesan youth chaplain.

In 1999 he was appointed rector of All Saints and St Modwen in what was a multi-racial parish in the same city.

In 2003, he accepted a post as team vicar for St Catherine's United Kingdom, the job evolved and he became Team Vicar with special responsibility for Holy Cross and St Michael's, within the Caludon Team Ministry.

Since his time in Coventry Cleophas has undertaken post-graduate study at Coventry University, attaining an MA focusing on Peace and Reconciliation.

He was consecrated and enthroned Bishop of Matabeleland on 1 March 2009.

In November 2026 he was appointed chair of the Anglican Communion Safe Church Commission.

== Notes ==
Religious titles
Preceded by Wilson Timothy Sitshebo	Bishop of Matabeleland; 2009 –	Succeeded by Current incumbent
