= Metlhayotlhe Beleme =

Bostwanan Anglican bishop

Metlhayotlhe Beleme (born 1962, Molepolole) is an Anglican bishop in Botswana.

Beleme trained as an electrician and worked at the Jwaneng diamond mine until 1989. He studied for the priesthood at Lelapa la Jesu Seminary; and at the National University of Lesotho. He was ordained in 1993. He has been Rector of Francistown; Archdeacon of North Botswana; Sub-Dean of Holy Cross Cathedral, Botswana; Rector of Tlokweng; Dean of the Cathedral of the Resurrection, Ikageng-Potchefstroom; Rector of Klerksdorp; and, from 2013, Bishop of Botswana.

Anglican Communion titles
Preceded by Trevor Mwamba	Bishop of Botswana; 2013	Succeeded by Incumbent
