= Kenneth Skelton =

2nd Bishop of Matabeleland

Kenneth John Fraser Skelton CBE (16 May 1918 – 30 July 2003) was the 2nd Bishop of Matabeleland in what was then known as Rhodesia and subsequently the 96th Bishop of Lichfield.

He was born on 16 May 1918 and educated at Dulwich College and Corpus Christi College, Cambridge. Ordained Deacon in 1941 and Priest a year later, his first post was as a curate at St Giles' Church, Normanton, Derby. After a spell as a tutor at Wells Theological College he held Lancastrian incumbencies at Atherton and Walton-on-the-Hill in Liverpool before his elevation to the episcopate. After eight years in Zimbabwe he returned to England to be Rector of Bishopwearmouth and Assistant Bishop of Durham before his Lichfield appointment in 1975. Eight years later he gave notice of his resignation but continued to serve the church as an honorary assistant bishop within the Sheffield and Derby dioceses until his death on 30 July 2003.

He recorded his experiences in Rhodesia in his book Bishop in Smith's Rhodesia: Notes on a Turbulent Octave.

== Notes ==
Church of England titles
Preceded by William James Hughes	Bishop of Matabeleland; 1962 – 1970	Succeeded by Stanley Mark Wood
Preceded by Arthur Stretton Reeve	Bishop of Lichfield; 1975 – 1984	Succeeded by Keith Norman Sutton
