= Lucinda Ashby =

American Episcopal bishop

The Right Reverend Lucinda Ashby
- Bishop of El Camino Real
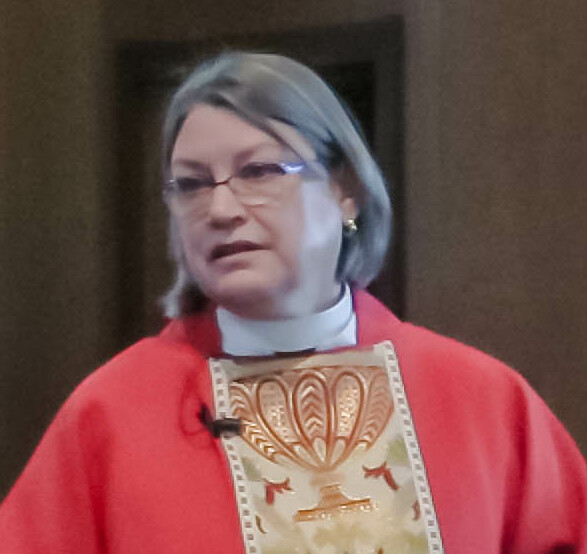
- Ashby in 2023
- Church: Episcopal Church
- Diocese: Episcopal Diocese of El Camino Real
- Elected: June 1, 2019
- In office: 2020–present
- Predecessor: Mary Gray-Reeves

Orders
- Ordination: 2004 by Jerry Lamb
- Consecration: January 11, 2020 by Michael Curry

Personal details
- Denomination: Anglican
- Spouse: Bob McEvilly
- Children: 3
- Education: Church Divinity School of the Pacific; Oberlin College

Lucinda Beth Ashby is the fourth and current bishop of the Episcopal Diocese of El Camino Real in the Episcopal Church.

== Biography ==
Prior to ordination Ashby had a career in education, teaching music and Spanish in grades 7 to 12 and was later head of a school in Sacramento. After ordination to the priesthood in 2004 she was assistant rector of St Martin's Church in Davis, California and then rector of St Matthew's Church in Sacramento, California. In 2011 she was appointed canon to the ordinary in the Episcopal Diocese of Idaho. She was elected bishop of El Camino Real on June 1, 2019, on the third ballot. She was then consecrated on January 11, 2020.
