= Commonwealth Deputy Secretary-General =

The deputy secretary-generals of the Commonwealth assist the secretary-general in managing the operations of the Commonwealth Secretariat, which is the central institution of the Commonwealth of Nations.

== History ==
Until 2016, three Commonwealth deputy secretaries-general assisted the secretary-general in running the Commonwealth Secretariat, each assigned an aspect of the Commonwealth's function to address particularly: one to economic affairs, one to political affairs and the other to corporate affairs.

They were elected by the Commonwealth heads of government, like the secretary-general. However, as their terms overlap with those of the secretary-general, and do not coincide with Commonwealth Heads of Government Meetings (CHOGMs), the heads of government are represented through their respective high commissioners in London. Originally, the Secretariat only engaged two deputy secretaries-general, whilst the corporate affairs portfolio was overseen by an assistant secretary-general. This changed in 2014 with the appointment of Gary Dunn from Australia to the post. However, by the end of March 2017, references to the role and Dunn had been removed from the Secretariat's website, indicating that the role may have been abolished though no announcement had been made to that effect.

Under Baroness Scotland's tenure as secretary-general, the vacancies left by the departures of Dunn, Deodat Maharaj, and Josephine Ojiambo were not filled and the three roles merged into a single post.

== Lists of deputy scretaries-general ==
Name	Country	Start	End
Arjoon Suddhoo	Mauritius	2019	Incumbent

=== Economic affairs and development ===
Deputy Secretary-General for Economic Affairs and Development of the Commonwealth of Nations
- Incumbent; Vacant since 2017
- Style: His Excellency
- Appointer: Commonwealth Heads of Government
- Term length: 3 years, renewable once
- Inaugural holder: Tilak E. Gooneratne
- Formation: 1965
- Final holder: Deodat Maharaj
- Abolished: Possibly June 2017
- Website: www.thecommonwealth.org

Name	Country	Start	End
Tilak E. Gooneratne	Sri Lanka	1965	1970
Geoffrey Wilson	United Kingdom	1971	1971
Hunter Wade	New Zealand	1972	1974
Incomplete
C. John Small	Canada	1979	1983
Peter Marshall	United Kingdom	1983	1988
Peter Unwin	United Kingdom	1989	1993
Humphrey Maud	United Kingdom	1993	1999
Veronica Sutherland	United Kingdom	1999	2001
Winston Cox	Barbados	2001	2006
Ransford Smith	Jamaica	2006	2013
Deodat Maharaj	Trinidad and Tobago	2014	2017

=== Political affairs ===
Deputy Secretary-General for Political Affairs of the Commonwealth of Nations
- Incumbent; Vacant (Appointments Suspended) since 2018
- Style: His/Her Excellency
- Appointer: Commonwealth Heads of Government
- Term length: 3 years, renewable once
- Inaugural holder: A.L. Adu
- Formation: 1966
- Website: www.thecommonwealth.org

Name	Country	Start	End
A. L. Adu	Ghana	1966	1970
M. A. Husain	India	1970	1977
Emeka Anyaoku	Nigeria	1977	1990^{1}
Anthony Siaguru	Papua New Guinea	1990	1995
Krishnan Srinivasan	India	1995	2002
Florence Mugasha	Uganda	2002	2008
Mmasekgoa Masire-Mwamba	Botswana	2008	2014
Josephine Ojiambo	Kenya	2015	2018

^{1} Initially served from 1977 to 1983, leaving his?? post for a few months to serve as Minister of Foreign Affairs in Nigeria. He was re-instated later that year.

=== Corporate affairs ===
Deputy Secretary-General for Corporate Affairs of the Commonwealth of Nations
- Incumbent; Vacant since 2016
- Style: His Excellency
- Appointer: Commonwealth Heads of Government
- Term length: 3 years, renewable once
- Inaugural holder: Gary Dunn
- Formation: 2014 – previously titled 'Assistant Secretary-General'
- Abolished: Unclear – possibly 2017
- Website: www.thecommonwealth.org

Name	Country	Start	End
Gary Dunn	Australia	2014	2016
