= Diocese of Botswana =

The Diocese of Botswana is one of 15 dioceses of the Anglican Church of the Province of Central Africa, a province of the Anglican Communion. It is a member of the Botswana Council of Churches.

Since 2003, Botswana has had a companion diocesan relationship with the Diocese of Newcastle in the Church of England.

In 2025 the first female deacons in the diocese were ordained. On May 17, 2026, the first female priests in the diocese were ordained; as such, they were also the first female priests ordained in the Church of the Province of Central Africa. The first of the women to be ordained that day was the Revd Beauty Autlwetse.

== List of Bishops of Botswana ==
- 1972–1978: C. Shannon Mallory
- 1979–2000: Walter Khotso Makhulu, also Archbishop of Central Africa from 1980 to 2000
- 2000–2005: Theo Naledi
- 2005–2013: Trevor Mwamba
- 2013- : Metlhayotlhe Beleme
