= Round Table movement =

British Empire unity advocacy group

The Round Table movement, founded in 1909, was an association of organisations promoting closer union between Britain and its self-governing colonies.

== History of the movement ==
The Round Table Movement, not to be confused with Round Table (club) - Wikipedia, evolved out of Milner's Kindergarten. With the election of the Campbell-Bannerman government in the United Kingdom in 1905, and the recognition of Afrikaner "Responsible Government", the Kindergarten went on a marketing campaign to influence popular elections that were to be held in the Transvaal and Orange River Colonies. With cooperation from F.S. Malan, the Afrikaner editor of Ons Land (Our Land), they published their thesis, A Review of the Present Mutual Relations of the British South African Colonies. Author Marlowe says, "From October 1906 they had been holding their meetings at a house in Johannesburg which (Richard) Feetham had had built for himself and which he called 'Moot House'. It was from this circumstance that future meetings of the Kindergarten and their associates came to be called, 'moots' after they had transferred their activities to the U.K." The term is derived from law school 'moot court'. They held meetings called 'The Moot', named after the Anglo-Saxon meeting, but also because they were discussing 'moot' points. The movement began at a conference at Plas Newydd, Lord Anglesey's estate in Wales, over the weekend of 4–6 September 1909. The framework of the organisation was devised by Lionel Curtis, but the overall idea was Lord Milner's. Former South Africa administrator Philip Kerr became secretary to the organisation.

In 1910 they published a periodical The Round Table Journal: A Quarterly Review of the Politics of the British Empire. The initial aim of the movement was closer union between Britain and the fully self-governing colonies, indeed per Lionel Curtis in the form of imperial federation, though key contributors such as Leo Amery and later consensus called merely for co-operation.

In that year and the next, Curtis took a tour of the Dominions to set up local Round Table groups. Groups were formed in Canada, the Union of South Africa, Australia, and New Zealand, and a Newfoundland Group was set up in 1912.

Curtis composed a series of 'Round Table Studies' which were circulated to all the Round Table groups, and the comments were also circulated. Curtis hoped that he would be able to produce a collective volume arguing the case for imperial federation; but agreement proved impossible, and in 1916 he published The Problem of the Commonwealth under his name only.

In the course of his studies, Curtis developed the 'principle' of a Commonwealth as involving the progressive enlargement of self-government among its members, an idea which already held or gained more favour among the Round Table groups than federation. A sub-group including James Meston and William Marris considered the place of India in any scheme of federation, and concluded that India would have to be represented.

In the First World War Philip Kerr prominently cemented what a new 'Commonwealth' might be, replacing the current empire, and antithetical to the German take on empire. Alfred Zimmern's welcome into the movement distanced it from Germanophobes, especially during the war.

The Round Table supported free trade despite Milner and Leo Amery's support for imperial preference, and endorsed the White Australia policy, publishing material by Frederic Eggleston on the matter.

With the entry of the United States into the First World War and the promotion of the League of Nations, the movement moderated its conception of the empire as a "Commonwealth of Nations" and concentrated on ways to improve communication and co-operation between Britain and the increasingly independent self-governing 'dominions'. It is reported to have had significant influence during the war.

Part of the funding for the Round Table Journal came from the Rhodes Trust. In the summer of 1921 Lord Milner, its principal manager, bequeathed it a final sum of £2,500 (equivalent to £125,000 in 2020).

During the interwar period the Round Table groups continued to advocate a policy of collaboration among the Dominions of the British Empire (Canada and Newfoundland, Australia, New Zealand, Union of South Africa, and a new creation, the Irish Free State) together with the United States. However, its embrace of the "Commonwealth" ethos also led it to support movements for self-government within the Empire such as the Anglo-Irish Treaty of 1921 and the Indian reforms of 1919 and 1935. In the late 1930s the contributors to the journal were split between those who advocated appeasement and those that did not.

The Round Table continued as a frequently contributed-to Commonwealth ginger group to consider and influence its scope and collaborations and what remained of policy such as granting of independence and, indeed, the territorial demarcations of the proposed independent states. After self-determination was fully exercised by such nations in the 1980s, with the technical exception of the very low-lying Chagos Archipelago whose people had been displaced decades earlier, the movement continues to be a banner for occasional talks and forums which reflect on the future shared activities, practices and extent of the Commonwealth.

== Prominent members ==
Prominent members of the Round Table 'moot' included:

=== First half of 20th century ===
- Leo Amery
- Lord Robert Brand
- Sir Reginald Coupland
- 2nd Baronet, Sir George Craik
- Lionel Curtis
- Geoffrey Dawson
- Lionel Hichens
- Philip Kerr, 11th Marquess of Lothian
- William Marris, Lord Marris
- James Meston, Lord Meston
- Alfred Milner, Lord Milner
- 2nd Earl of Selborne
- Sir Arthur Steel-Maitland
- Sir Alfred Zimmern

=== Second half of 20th century ===
- Guy Barnett
- Leonard Beaton
- Henry Brooke
- Alastair Buchan
- Sir Olaf Caroe
- Baron Gore-Booth
- Malcolm Hailey, 1st Baron Hailey
- Vincent T. Harlow
- H.V. Hodson
- Richard Hornby
- Sir Michael Howard
- Douglas Hurd
- Derek Ingram
- Robert Jackson
- Alan Lennox-Boyd
- Sir Clement Leslie
- Sir Ivison Macadam
- Sir Dougal Malcolm
- Sir Nicholas Mansergh
- Adam Denzil Marris
- Sir John Maud, Baron Redcliffe-Maud
- Sir Humphrey Maud
- Sir Jeremy Morse
- Sir Robert Wade-Gery
- Sir Robin Williams

== Conspiracy theory ==
Georgetown University Professor and Council on Foreign Relations archivist Carroll Quigley published what he regarded as documented proof that the Round Table Group was the front for a secret society for a global conspiracy of control set up by Cecil Rhodes named the Society of the Elect to implement Rhodes's plan (detailed in his will) to unite all English-speaking nations, and further believed that the elite of the British Empire had an undue influence on the American elite.

Honorary Secretary of the Round Table Group, Sir Ivison Macadam, thought Quigley was "crazy". As one writer noted in a journal of arts, politics and letters published triannually by of the Association of American Rhodes Scholars, the "tragedy of Quigley was his conviction that he was outside of an inner circle that itself did not exist"

== See also ==
- Coefficients (dining club)
