= Harry Hodson =

English economist, editor, Provost of Ditchley Foundation (1906–1999)

Personal details
- Born: 1906 Edmonton, London
- Died: 1999 (aged 92–93) London, England
- Spouse(s): Margaret Elizabeth Honey; 1913–2002
- Occupation: Editor The Sunday Times, Provost Ditchley Foundation.

Henry Vincent Hodson (12 May 1906 – 26 March 1999, aged 92) was an English economist, editor of The Sunday Times, founding Provost of the Ditchley Foundation and editor of The Annual Register.

== Positions held ==
Henry Vincent Hodson, 1906-1999 (aged 92) was a Fellow of All Souls College, Oxford, 1928–1935; Assistant Editor, The Round Table 1931–1934, Editor 1934–1939; Director, Empire Division, Ministry of Information 1939–1941; Reforms Commissioner, Government of India 1941–42; Principal Assistant Secretary/head of Non-Munitions Division, Ministry of Production 1942–1945; Editor, The Sunday Times 1950–1961, Assistant Editor 1946–1950; Provost of the Ditchley Foundation 1961–1971; Master, Mercers' Company 1964–65; Editor, The Annual Register 1973–1988.

== Education ==
Hodson was born in Edmonton, London. He was educated at Gresham's School, Holt, and Balliol College, Oxford, becoming a Fellow of All Souls College, Oxford, in 1928–35.

== The Round Table ==
In 1931 he joined The Round Table, the journal established by former members of Milner's Kindergarten a group of very able young men including the politician and novelist John Buchan (later Lord Tweedsmuir Governor-General of Canada), the constitutional scholar Lionel Curtis, the banker Robert Brand, Lionel Hichens and others who were determined to create a liberal regime in South Africa to advance the imperial cause but later coined and supported an independent Commonwealth. The international quarterly was founded in 1910 with Philip Kerr as its first editor. Hodson became assistant editor from 1931 and then Editor from 1934 to 1939. and as such it meant he was secretary to the "Moot", its editorial board, handling the correspondence and regularly visiting the Commonwealth Dominions.

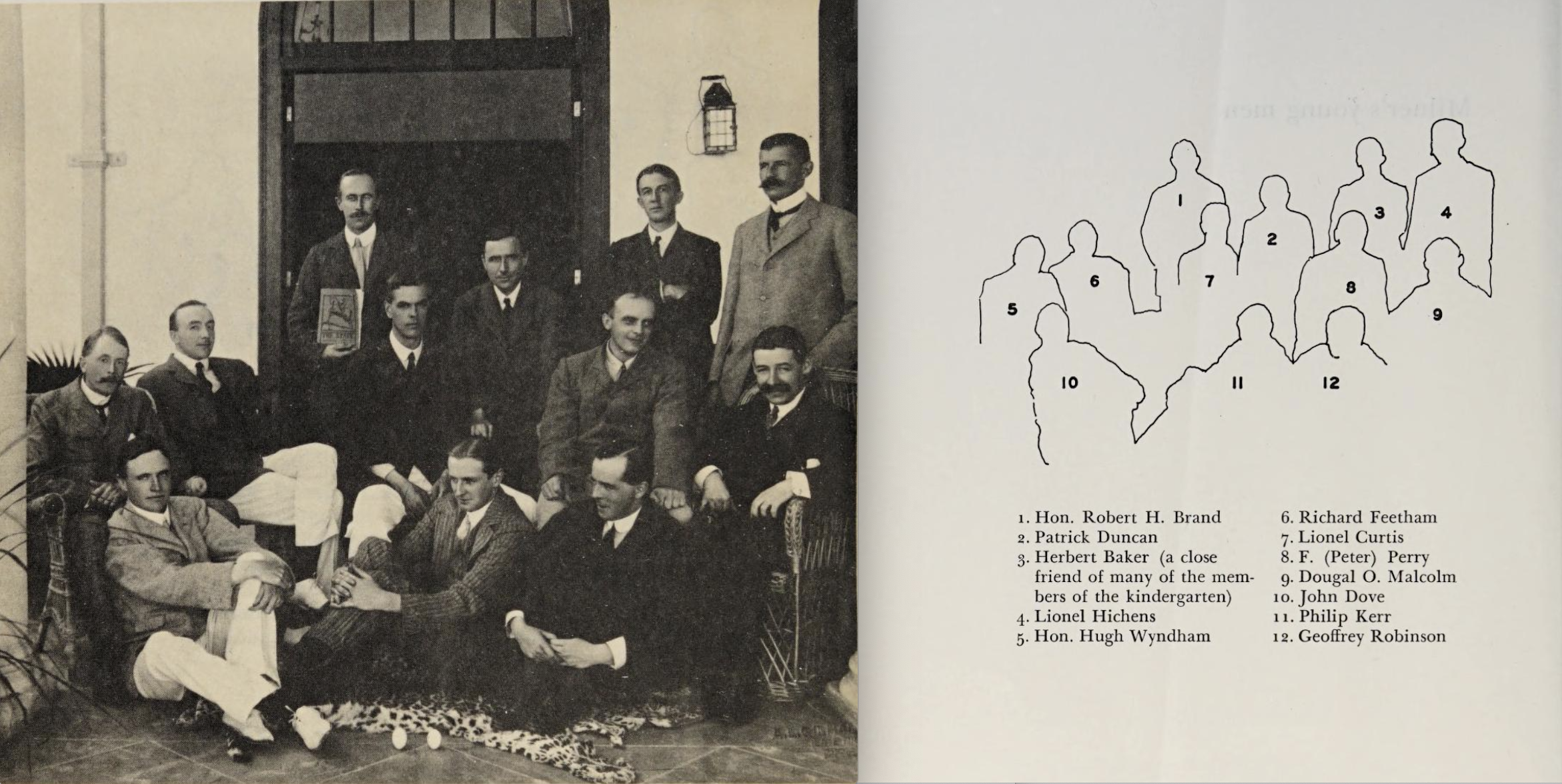
Milner's Kindergarten, 1902

A total of eight years which gave him an intimate knowledge of the Dominions and the Commonwealth.

Hodson's connection to The Round Table was lifelong. His first article, England in the Great Depression appeared in 1930 and his last Crown and Commonwealth was 65 years later in 1995. He contributed over sixty articles to the journal and remained an active editorial board member until his death.

The Round Table Harry Hodson Prize was established as an annual Award after his death to mark the nearly seventy years involvement of its late editor with the journal. It is awarded for a written piece of work by an undergraduate or postgraduate student from a university in the Commonwealth.

== Commonwealth conference 1938 ==
Owing to his intimate knowledge of all the Commonwealth countries that he had gained through his frequent visits to them with his eight years of editorial experience on The Round Table quarterly, Hodson was the official Rapporteur of the Second Commonwealth Conference from 3–17 September 1938, organised by the Royal Institute of International Affairs (Chatham House) and held at Lapstone near Sydney, Australia.

Lord Lothian led the British delegation. This was a year before Lothian became the wartime British Ambassador to the United States. This conference followed the initial one held in Toronto in 1933. This second one in Australia was held just a year prior to WWII and so was highly consequential.

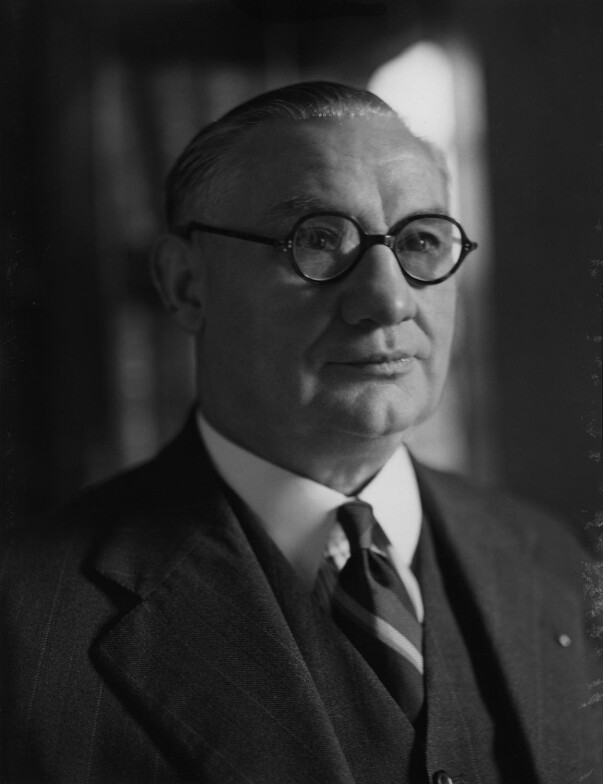
Ernest Bevin (later to become Foreign Secretary in the post war Attlee Labour government)

The rest of the delegation from Britain included the General Secretary of the Transport and General Workers' Union Ernest Bevin, (he subsequently served as Minister of Labour and National Service in the wartime coalition government and British Foreign Minister in the post-WWII Attlee Labour government so as Foreign Secretary from 1945 to 1951 he held office at the outset of the Cold War, the independence of India and the formation of NATO in 1949), James Walker M.P., General John Burnett-Stuart, Admiral John Kelly, Geoffrey Vickers V.C., Lionel Curtis and Ivison Macadam (Conference Secretary).

The significance of this conference was that it exposed the then five active Commonwealth countries, (Canada, Australia, New Zealand, South Africa and the United Kingdom) to the possibility that war with Germany lay ahead and it gave each of them a full year to prepare and decide whether each of these independent Commonwealth nations would voluntarily commit their armed forces should war break out.

In the event when it did, they all committed at their own volition to declare their nations at war with Germany after Britain had done so on 3 September 1939. As it turned out Britain could not have held out on its own without the Commonwealth countries contribution after the fall of France and before the United States joined the conflict in December 1941 and so they were to play a vital role in the Battle of the Atlantic, the Battle of Britain in the air, the Italian Campaign, the Normandy landings and the many other land and sea battles that led to the liberation of Europe and the ultimate defeat of Hitler's Germany.

== Ministry of Information ==
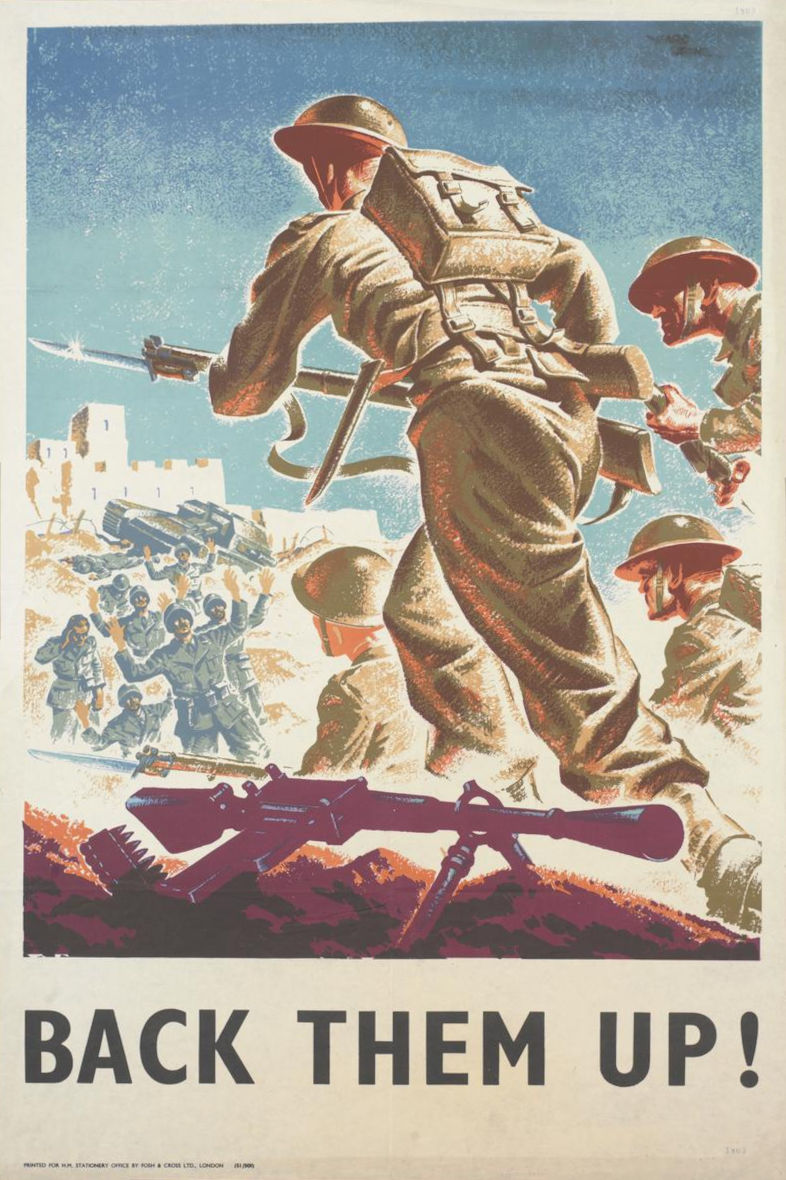
Ministry of Information poster

When war broke out in 1939, Hodson took charge of the Empire Division of the Ministry of Information, where he edited a weekly newsletter. He was Director of the Empire Division of the Ministry of Information from 1939 to 1941.

== India ==
He was appointed in 1941 Reforms Commissioner where he joined the staff of Viceroy of India, the Marquess of Linlithgow until 1942. His personal channel however to Leo Amery, the Secretary of State for India was blocked by Linlithgow. Also Hodson's effort to gently move the country towards Dominion status was frustrated by Stafford Cripps mission, which led to problems and Muslim demands for the separation of Pakistan so Hodson returned to Britain in 1942. His work there and his grasp of Indian affairs resulted in his book The Great Divide; Britain-India-Pakistan, published in 1969.

== Ministry of Production ==
Returning to England in 1942, he was made Principal Assistant Secretary and later Head of Non-Munitions, at the Ministry of Production in 1942 until 1945. There he was responsible for everything not related to munitions or food.

== The Sunday Times ==
At the end of the Second World War, he returned to journalism, becoming Assistant Editor of The Sunday Times from 1946 to 1950, and then Editor of the paper from 1950 until 1961, and thus editor of what was one of the most influential newspapers in Britain.

A lucid leader-writer with a thorough knowledge of Commonwealth problems and Anglo-American Relationship, Hodson took over the editorship of a 10-page paper in 1950. With the end of newsprint restrictions he saw its pages rise to 48 pages. The newspapers circulation under his editorship roughly doubled from 500,000 and passed a million, then a prodigious figure for a serious newspaper. This was achieved despite formidable competition from the other quality Sunday "heavy", The Observer edited by David Astor during what many consider was that paper's golden years.

Hodson hired able assistants such as William Rees-Mogg (later editor of The Times 1967 - 1981) and Frank Giles (ultimately himself becoming editor of The Sunday Times 1981–1983). Also during Hodson's tenure The Sunday Times was the first paper to publish, in 1958, a separate Review section enclosed with the paper each week.

His experience showed when early on in the Suez Crisis he wrote an article from America warning of serious consequences.

Hodson and his somewhat staid proprietor the Viscount Kemsley sometimes had a difficult relationship. When Kemsley phoned him one time after dinner during the Korean War to demand the Americans drop an Atomic bomb, Hodson threatened to resign.

Hodson wrote what was considered a significant and transformational leading editorial (leader) advocating the liberalisation of the law relating to homosexuality. This from the pen of a devout Anglican was far ahead of the social and religious mores of the time (and to proprietorial concern). It led to the setting up of the Wolfenden Commission which resulted in the Wolfenden report and homosexual decriminalisation.

As editor, although appreciating good writing he was ready to kill a music critics copy for being too highbrow and he dispensed of the services of Sacheverell Sitwell as Atticus for lacking incisiveness.

The Sunday Times and the Kemsley group was bought in 1959 by Lord Thomson, and after two years of amicable relations with Roy Thomson, Hodson stepped down. He thereafter was a regular presence at the Friday leader (editorial) conferences and was a steadying voice of Conservatism amongst the more radical of those present.

== The Institute for Race Relations ==
At the Fourth Commonwealth Relations conference held at Bigwin Inn, Muskoka lakes, Canada in September 1949 Hodson had been impressed that the larger Commonwealth, by then consisting of eight countries, the United Kingdom, Canada, Australia, New Zealand, South Africa, India, Pakistan and Ceylon, now Sri Lanka, and recognised it was a far more disparate group of nations than it had been in the three earlier Commonwealth Relations conferences, in 1933 in Toronto, in 1938 at Sydney and in 1945 at Chatham House, London during WWII. Hodson, as a participant, knew the previous ones had largely been involved with Commonwealth relations between the predominately white nations discussing their inter-constitutional and diplomatic matters, although with national guest observers. At the 1949 conference he felt they were all faced with a new and different reality ' as to the changing relationships among peoples of different races, cultures and history, which gave them far different outlooks upon national and international affairs.'

Hodson, then still the editor of The Sunday Times, had been invited in 1950, after the conference had finished, to give an address at Chatham House on Race Relations in the Commonwealth .

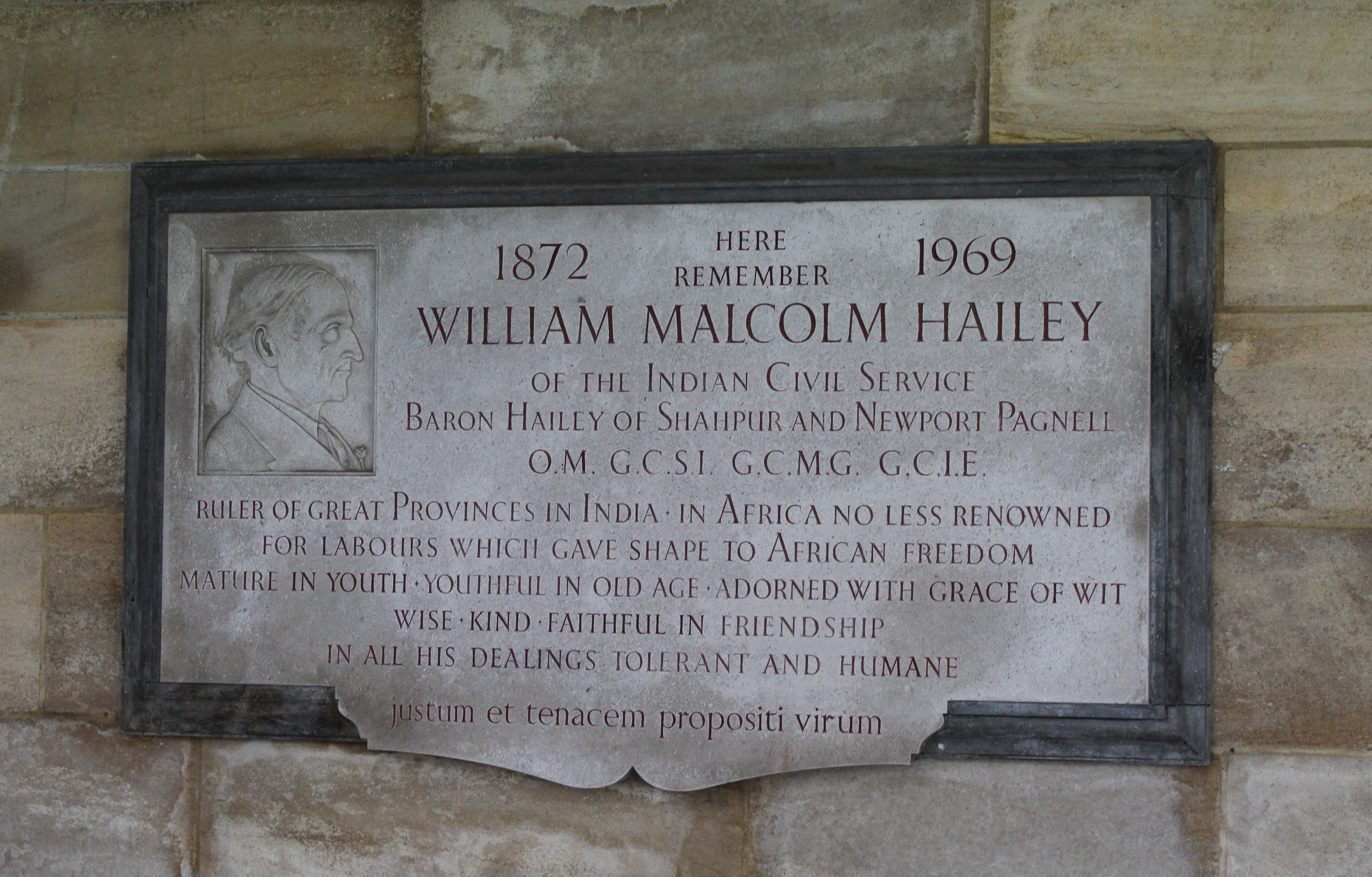
William Malcolm Hailey memorial plaque, Westminster Abbey

As a result, Hodson was the inspiration for the formation of The Institute for Race Relations and thus its founder. It began as a fledgling part of the Race Relations Unit of The Royal Institute of International Affairs (Chatham House) in 1952 under the Chairmanship of Lord Hailey.

After three years as an embryonic part of Chatham House it evolved into the new and separately housed Institute of Race Relations. The council was chaired by Sir Alexander Carr-Saunders. (Carr-Saunders had been a director of the London School of Economics, and had also served with Hodson on the Colonial Social Science Research Council). Hodson felt he combined rigorous academic knowledge with good administrative talents. Under him and his successor Leslie Farrer-Brown, with the director Philip Mason, the Institute of Race Relations "flourished". It received support from the Ford, Nuffield, and other foundations. It publishing books, pamphlets and journals, and built an international reputation.

After twenty years Hodson believed it began to evolve into a different body with a very different purpose. Living by then at Ditchley, Hodson had resigned from the IRR Council but remained for a while as vice-president. However he and the entire council resigned in April 1972, when it appeared that it had been turned into a British race relations group far different from its original intended role of deeper understanding of the differing races and expanding knowledge of their national cultures within the Commonwealth of Nations.

== The Mercers ==
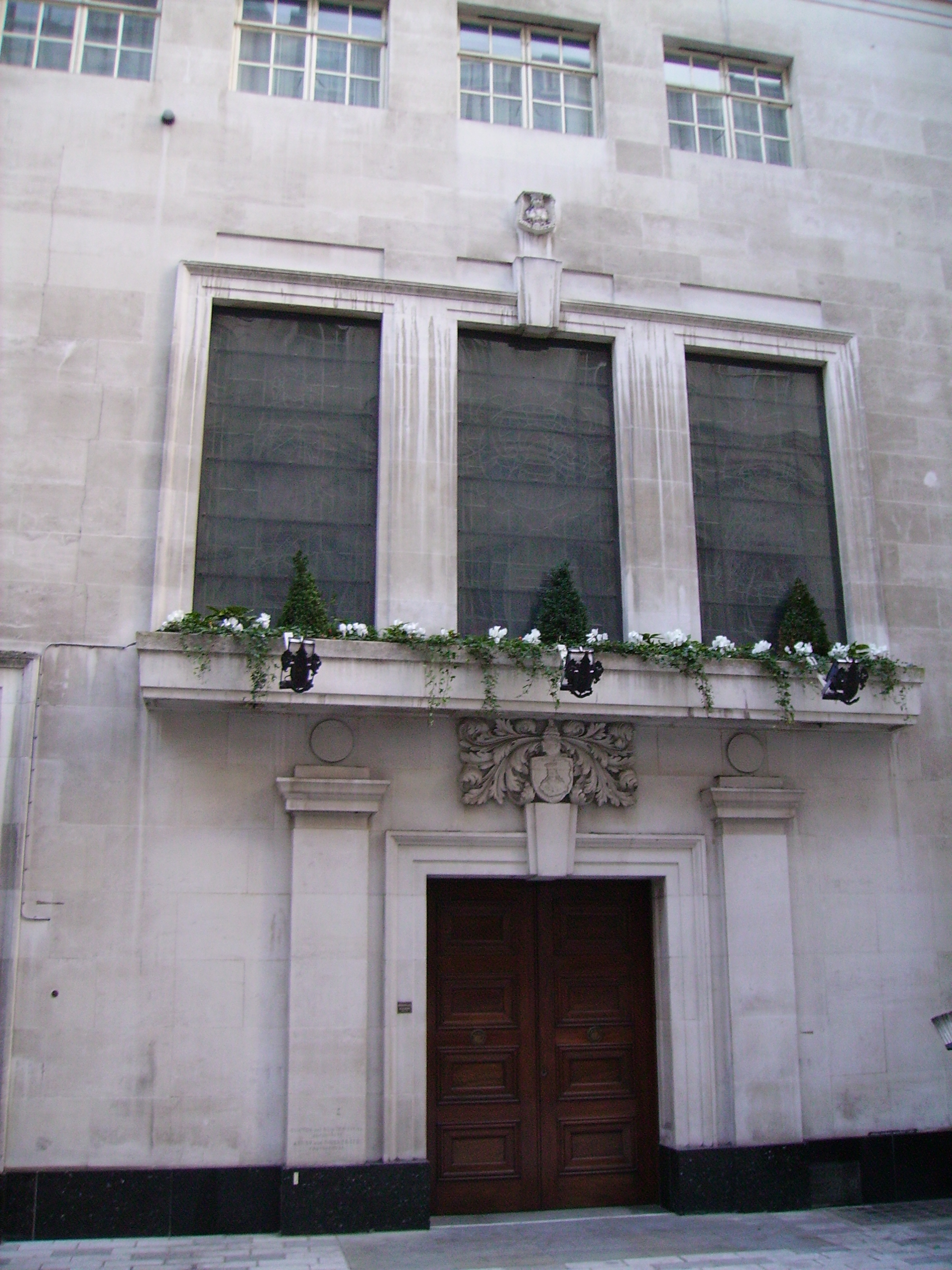
Mercers Hall London

From 1927, aged 21, Hodson was a freeman of the Mercers' Company by right of patrimony. He was a member of the Mercers’ Court from 1960. He became Master of the company in July 1964. He remained active on it until a few months before his death. The Mercers’ Company as the premier livery company in the City of London, founded in 1394, is focused on philanthropy. Its history dating back over 700 years had philanthropy as the common thread. The Mercers, that is, merchants, dealers in high-valued products like cloth-of-gold, had lost even by Tudor times most or all of their functions as regulators of trade in the City of London. It has had famous Masters such as Richard Whittington, Henry Colet and Thomas Gresham and others going back centuries. It aims to distribute £10 million annually to charitable causes mostly in London, Norfolk and the Northeast of England. Each year it supports around 180 individual organisations.

Whilst its connection to its original trade has diminished over time, it maintains centuries-old links with Associated Schools & Colleges, the British Armed Forces, Church Livings, the City of London Corporation and other livery companies. Although the time spent was voluntary, Hodson recalls that by the time he reached the chair, the work of the Master was starting to get heavier than in the past. He reckoned the Master Mercer has duties that fill half of normal working hours each week, not counting evening engagements, which were frequent for the Master of the premier livery company. In the process he had a minor heart attack but was soon able to continue his work, while directing the activities of the Ditchley Foundation(see below).

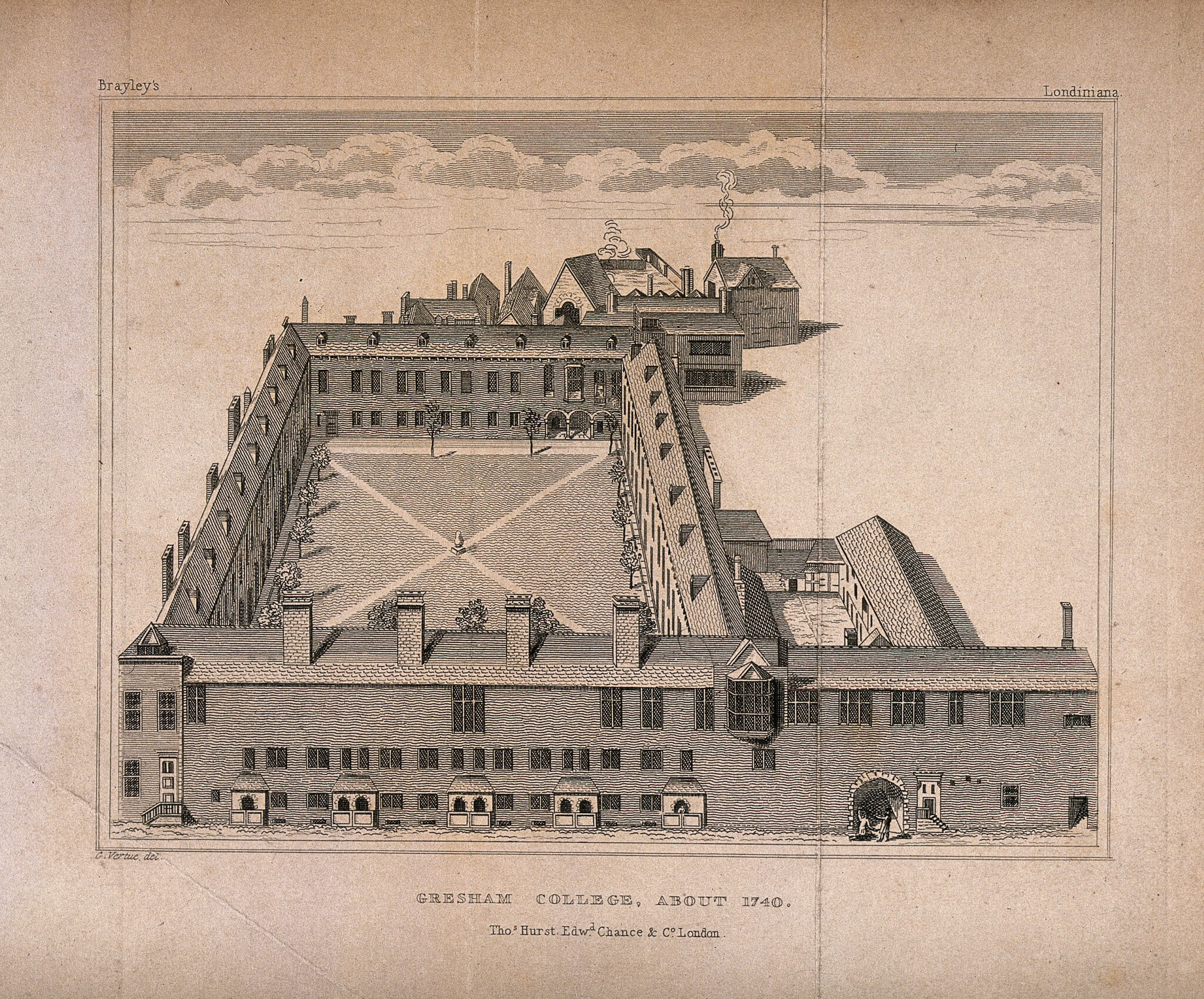
Engraving of Gresham College in 1740

Hodson led the enormous initiative over some years (with David Vermont and Rt Rev Richard Chartres) that was responsible for the reestablishment of Gresham College as an independent entity. They did so using Sir Thomas Gresham's endowment funds that had since been divided among the Mercers and City of London endowments. Gresham College had been providing free public lectures since 1597, when Sir Thomas Gresham founded the college to bring the 'new learning' to Londoners (Gresham is also noted for his founding of the Royal Exchange). Twenty-five years later Hodson's son Anthony (also a past Master of the Mercer's and Gresham College's three time chairman and member of its council) helped launch the college onto the Internet to lead to, nearly thirty years on, its present global free outreach lecture activities.

== Ditchley Foundation ==
Ditchley was founded as a privately funded charity in 1958 by the philanthropist Sir David Wills in order to support the Transatlantic Alliance between the United States and Europe by bringing decision makers and experts together in a unique and inspiring setting. He was moved to act by painful memories of the Second World War and the dangers of the Cold War.

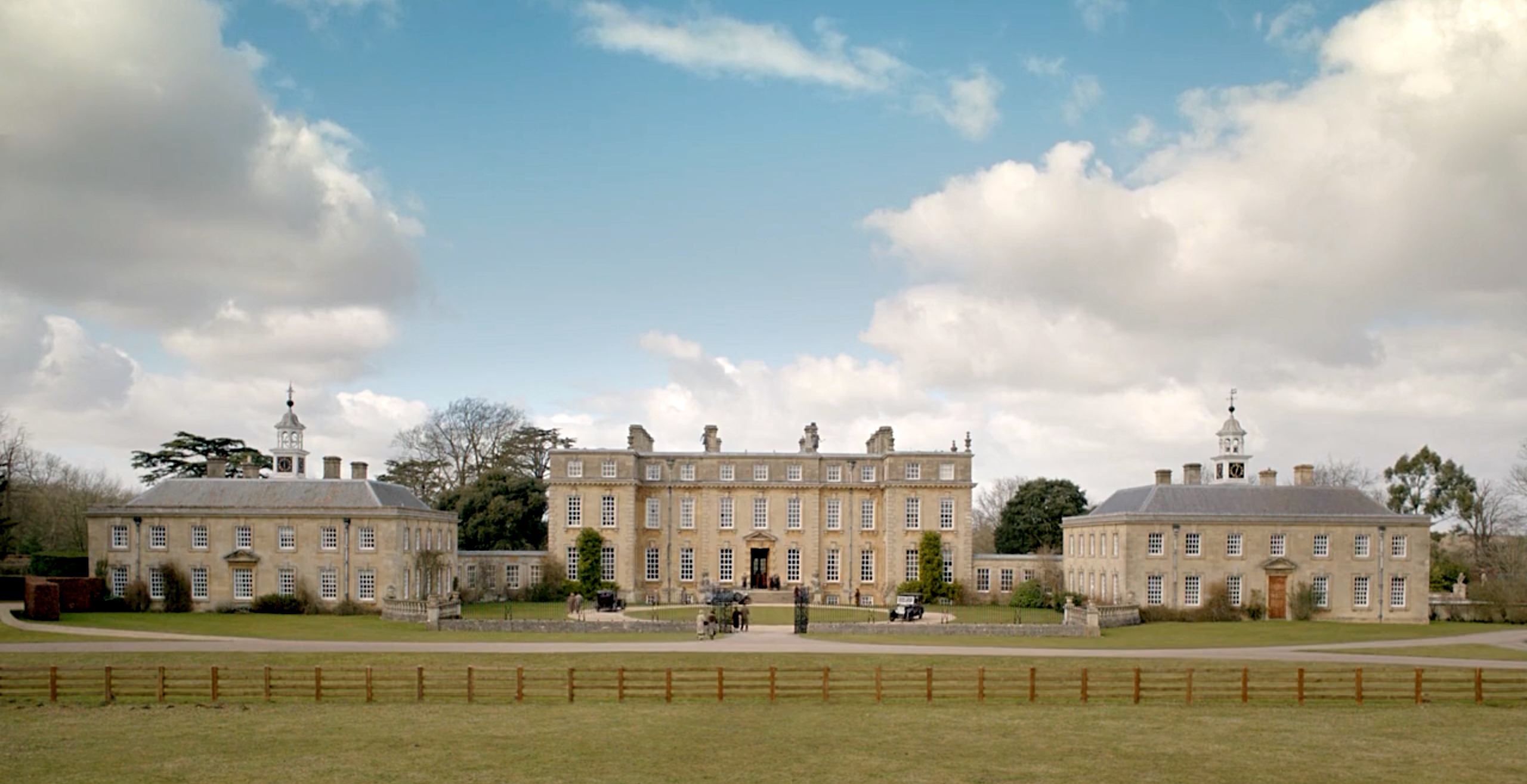
Ditchley House, home of the Ditchley Foundation, Oxfordshire, England

Hodson was appointed the first Provost (later known as Director) of the Ditchley Foundation in 1961, after the great house's compfortable remodelling for conferences.

First he had to put in extra effort into the conversion of the original great house into a comfortable residential conference centre. In this he was vastly aided by his wife Margaret. She was a very able interior decorator as well as hostess, with a broad vision of what was required, and had the energy and management skills to bring it all to fruition.

Harry Hodson's concept from the outset in organising the conferences was "Go for the best...". He sought advice on this from old friends who were experienced in organising international meetings and conferences. He reasoned that if he invited from Washington, an Assistant Under-Secretary of State, he might recommend one of his subordinates; so better invite the Secretary of State himself, and he would send an Under-Secretary. He considered, or found out, who was the top person in any category he was looking for, civil servant, diplomat, politician, business leader, academic expert or whatever and went all out for him or her. In the worst case, if the invitation was declined, they would probably refer him to someone just about as good. " So that is what I did, and it worked. " Hodson remembered that Ditchley was unknown in those formative days; all it had to recommend was the eminence of its sponsoring Council members and Governors and an illustrated brochure about the house (with its American connections through the Lee family of Virginia and Ditchley, and through Winston Churchill's use of it for talks with United States leaders and others during the war) and about the Foundation itself. What counted was their own estimation of Ditchley " as second to none, as a place and a purpose quite unique, and our determination to be so regarded."

Hodson had implemented the concept of the philosopher Isaiah Berlin, who was an early supporter of Ditchley and had a strong influence on Ditchley's approach, for example through his conception of liberty as a process as well as a state. More pragmatically he wrote a letter that guides Ditchley in framing meetings today, advising that it was important to include “all kinds of apparently irrelevant persons,” dreading otherwise “a lot of dull-faced men probably saying it had all been very interesting...”. He stressed the value of leaving space for informal conversations and urged against too many presentations. Berlin came to love Ditchley, writing, “Moscow, Oxford, Ditchley, Harvard and Washington: each is a kind of legendary world framed within its own conventions.”

Hodson held between 20 and 25 conferences a year. This meant that he and his wife entertained, for a weekend or occasionally longer, between 700 and 800 guests each year. Some people went to more than one conference, but the net figure was over 5,000. They included ambassadors and foreign service officers not only from Britain and the United States, but from many other countries as well, government ministers, senior civil servants, Peers and MPs, Senators and Congressmen, leading figures from the United Nations, the World Bank and other international agencies, leading business men, trade union leaders, economists and experts of all kinds. They ranged from young American students attending courses, to Prince Philip, Duke of Edinburgh, who presided over a conference, 'inspired by that life-changer' his former headmaster Kurt Hahn, on rescue, relief and service. (When Hodson was thanking the Duke he said he was one of the best chairmen Ditchley had ever had; he laughed " I bet you say that to everyone. ” Hodson wrote, he certainly did not. Prince Philip worked hard when he took on a job like that, keeping long-winded speakers in order, directing the discussion to a purposeful end, and summarising the previous debate at the start of each session.)

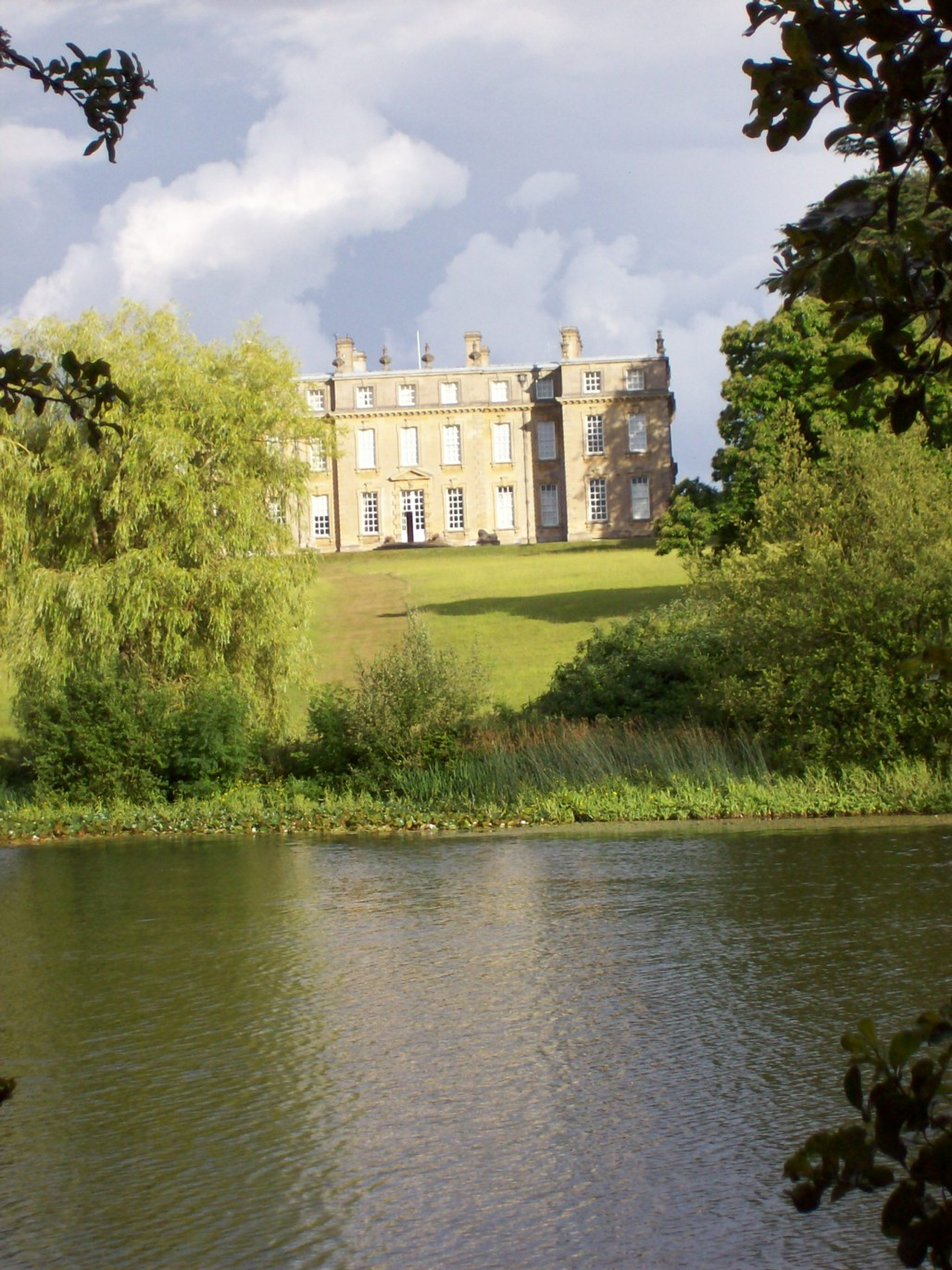
Ditchley from the lake

Hodson initiated American Legislators' conferences, to which were invited hand-picked United States Senators and Congressmen to discuss with their parliamentary counterparts, MPs and Peers, and a few British experts, some subject of major common concern. These conferences became a permanent annual feature of the Ditchley programme. Not only was each of them a valuable exercise in itself, but in the course of years it came about that almost all the most influential members of the two Houses of Congress had been welcomed to Ditchley and affected by its genius. Among those who came in his time, whose names are well known on the other side of the Atlantic, were Senators Robert and Edward Kennedy, Walter Mondale, Henry (Scoop) Jackson, John Tunney, Ed Muskie, Frank Church, Charles (Chuck) Percy, Daniel (Pat) Moynihan and New York Mayor John Lindsay and many others.

Because of Hodson and Margaret, his vivacious wife and hostess, Ditchley was recognised internationally over the ten years during their tenure as an internationally renowned centre for a variety of conferences and especially those furthering Anglo - American understanding. It is a living memorial to his and his wife's genius and remains an important institution carrying on in the manner he originally envisioned and further fashioned over its first decade.

Hodson ultimately retired from Ditchley when he reached the age 65 in 1971 but its activities remain ongoing.

== The Annual Register ==
He was Editor of The Annual Register responsible for the fifteen years from 1973 - 88. The Annual Register is the world's oldest continuously published annual reference book founded by Edmund Burke.

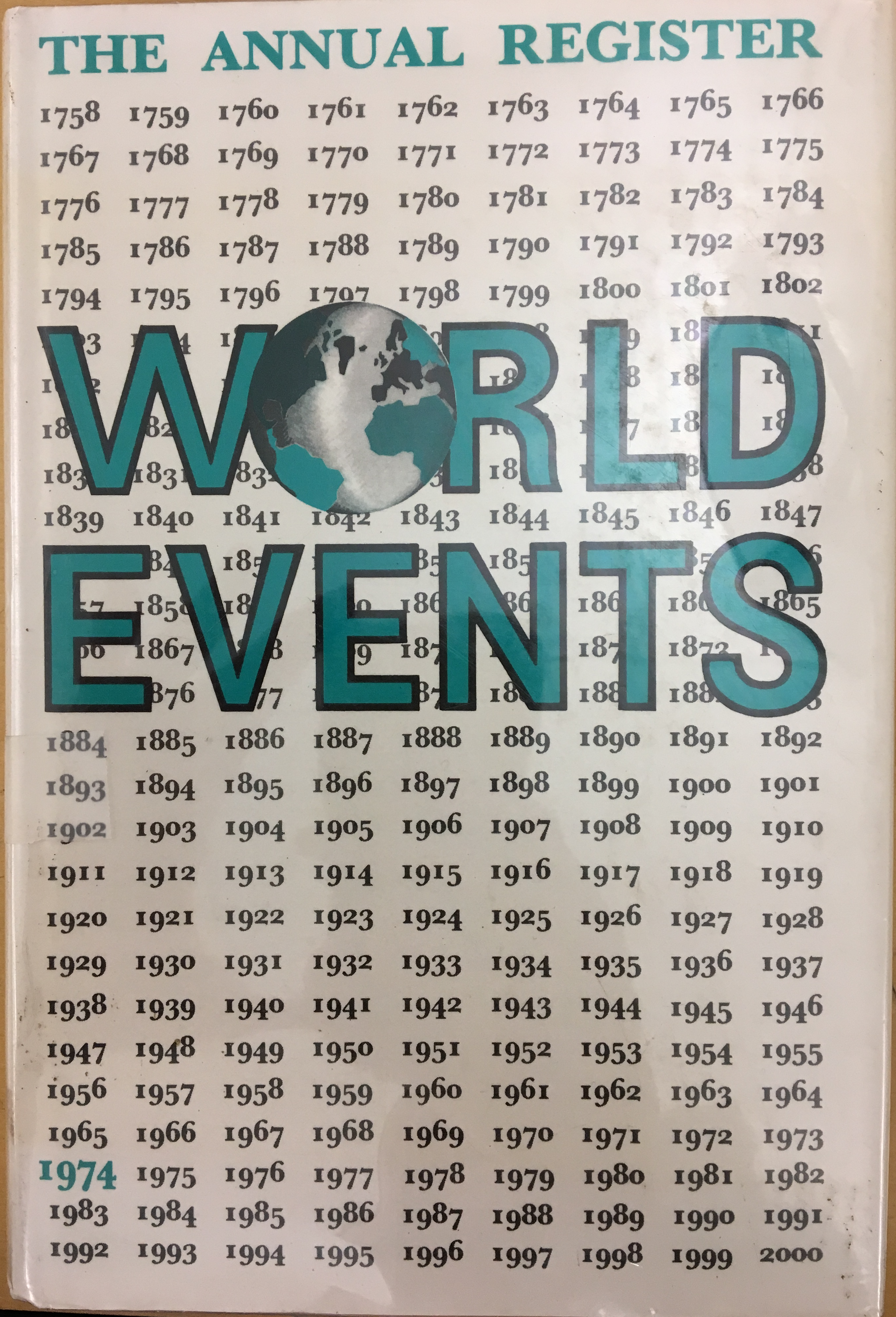
The Annual Register World Events in 1974 - book cover

When Hodson took on his last job, as editor of the Annual Register he was conscious that it was not as well known as The Sunday Times and was a delighted when former prime minister Harold Macmillan responded "Never heard of it? I could never have written my memoirs without reference to the Annual Register."

In fact the Annual Register had undoubtedly been used by many prime ministers. When Winston Churchill was a young subaltern in India he asked his mother to send him as many past volumes of The Annual Register from previous years that she could find. He read these avidly and annotated them with his own criticisms or improvements of prior prime minister's speeches or policies written in the margins. For a future world statesman this was obviously an ingenius way to educate himself about world affairs and politics. His marked up volumes of The Annual Register are today in the Churchill Archives at Cambridge University.

The Telegraph described Hodson's fifteen years at The Annual Register's helm as having introduced new sections on statistics, defence, environment and fashion.

== Governing bodies of educational establishments ==
He was a governor of Gresham's School at Holt Norfolk, his former school, for 21 years.

He sat on the governing body of Abingdon School from 1972 to 1986.

He served on Gresham College Council for many years.

== Personal life ==
He married Margaret Elizabeth Honey (1913 - 2002) in Brisbane, Australia on 28 March 1933.

He died in Kensington and Chelsea, London in 1999, aged 92.

He and his wife had four sons: Nicholas Jeremy Hodson (b.1934), Anthony Edward Hodson (b.1937), Daniel Houghton Hodson (b.1944), and Henry "Charles" Hodson (b. 1955). All were Mercers and sons Anthony and Daniel Hodson were past Masters.

== Publications ==
Hodson's publications include:

- Economics of a Changing World (1933),
- The Empire in the World (1937),
- Slump and Recovery (1929, revised 1937 and 1938),
- The British Commonwealth and the Future (1939),
- Twentieth Century Empire (1948),
- Problems of Anglo-American Relations (1963),
- The Great Divide: Britain-India-Pakistan (1969),
- The Diseconomics of Growth (1972).
