= F. S. Oliver =

British writer and businessperson (1864-1934)

Frederick Scott Oliver (20 February 1864 – 3 June 1934), known as F. S. Oliver, was a prominent Scottish political writer and businessman who advocated tariff reform and imperial union for the British Empire. He played an important role in the Round Table movement, collaborated in the downfall of Prime Minister H. H. Asquith's wartime government and its replacement by David Lloyd George in 1916, and pressed for "home rule all round" to resolve the political conflict between Britain and Irish nationalists.

== Education and business career ==
Oliver was born on 20 February 1864 to Catherine McLaren and John Scott Oliver. His grandfather was Duncan McLaren. His father was a merchant and he attended Edinburgh University. He then went to Trinity College, Cambridge, where he became a lifelong friend of Austen Chamberlain and his imperial-minded father, Joseph Chamberlain. Oliver practiced law for three years, but he abandoned this career because he wanted to marry his first cousin Katharine Augusta McLaren. He joined the linen drapery firm of Debenham & Freebody which enabled him to marry. He became a partner in 1904. The company was extraordinarily successful and he was a rich man by 1914.

== Major writings and political thought ==
A lifelong Unionist Party (UK) member, Oliver expressed his political leanings in a series of books, pamphlets, and newspaper articles. In one of his first pamphlets, The Statesman and the Bishop, he came out in favour of Imperial Federation, saying that: "… the union of the British race, the firm and effective federation of our people in all quarters of the earth, appears to me to be of such transcendent importance as a matter of both morals and of politics, that if the achievement of it required a sacrifice instead of a gain, I should be prepared to make it.

"The desire for union, the grand Federal Idea, comes first, and a long way first among my motives."

In 1906 Oliver published the biography Alexander Hamilton, which used the example set by the federalists of the early United States to argue for a federal arrangement for the British Empire. The book came to the attention of Lord Alfred Milner and the members of "Milner's Kindergarten," who were then engaged in the reconstruction of South Africa following the Boer War of 1899–1902. According to Leo Amery, a friend of the kindergarten, "Alexander Hamilton became the Bible of the young men of Milner’s Kindergarten." In 1934 The Times asserted, "The book had probably more influence than any other political book of the decade." Novelist John Buchan, another friend of the Kindergarten, believed that Oliver had "a real and enduring influence on political thought."

Oliver's biography of Hamilton was also influential in the United States. Oliver had interpreted the Hamilton–Jefferson rivalry as a conflict between two ideologies and types of statesmanship: the one based on reality, the other duped by illusion; the one commanding, the other led by circumstances; the one nationalist, the other individualistic. Theodore Roosevelt praised the book and sent copies to Henry Cabot Lodge and Whitelaw Reid, and Walter Lippmann hailed it as "one of the noblest biographies in our language". According to Newton D. Baker, Woodrow Wilson also greatly admired the book.

Oliver also wrote numerous political articles for The Times using the pseudonym "Pacificus". These articles, which first appeared in May 1910, outlined his federalist ideas, especially his proposal for the establishment of separate parliaments in the United Kingdom to deal with purely local issues, while a supreme parliament would be responsible for national and Imperial concerns. Even while advocating the creation of parliaments for Britain and the Empire as a whole, Oliver was deeply critical of British democracy. He expressed these feelings in private, such as a letter he wrote during World War I that said, "…Democracy is not going to win this war or any other – if we win, it will be because the spirit of the small remnant who hate and despise democracy and all its works will save the country in spite of its democratic government." His attitude led him to play a part in the fall of the Asquith government later in the war as a member of the so-called Monday Night Cabal."

== "Milner’s Kindergarten" and the Round Table movement ==
Oliver’s book Alexander Hamilton brought him into contact with Milner's Kindergarten, in 1906, and most of its members returned to England in 1909 when it became clear that British South Africa would be unified. Led by Lord Milner, Lionel Curtis, and Philip Henry Kerr, the Kindergarten held a series of meetings to establish the Round Table movement, having as its immediate goal the federation of the British Empire. Oliver also attended the meetings, most notably at Plas Newydd, where most of the planning was completed, and once the Round Table was established, he maintained a "keen" interest in its affairs for the rest of his life. A member of the movement’s central committee, or "Moot," he helped to edit The Round Table Journal during the latter half of World War I, and contributed his own anonymous articles.

== The "Monday Night Cabal" ==
After World War I broke out in 1914, Oliver and many of his friends in the Round Table felt frustrated by the policies of Prime Minister H. H. Asquith. Like Oliver, a number of Round Table members, most notably Lord Milner, also distrusted British democracy, and they began to look for ways to replace Asquith with someone who shared their ideas. They especially pressed for "national service," or conscription, to replace Britain’s volunteer army, a position Oliver had held even before war with Germany broke out.

Each Monday night a group of these and other men met to discuss strategies for deposing Asquith. The main members included: Oliver, Lord Milner, Lord Carson, Geoffrey Robinson (known from 1917 as Geoffrey Dawson), Waldorf Astor, General Henry Wilson, Philip Kerr, Leander Starr Jameson, and David Lloyd George. In 1916 the Asquith government finally introduced conscription. Asquith fell from power in December 1916 and was replaced by Lloyd George, whereupon the new government carried out further measures in an attempt to make a stronger military effort in the war. Since not all of these men were Round Table members, some historians argue that the activities of the Monday Night Cabal were not Round Table-related, while others see them as part of a larger pattern of attempts by the Round Table to influence political events from behind-the-scenes.

== Later years and death ==
Following World War I, Oliver reduced his political activities, though he remained a member of the Round Table and continued writing books and essays. He was particularly disappointed by the political settlement reached with Ireland, which ran counter to his desire for a federalized system for Britain and Ireland. In 1916 he bought a house at Edgerston near Jedburgh and in 1926 he retired from Debenhams. In 1928 he bought Queen Mary's House in Jedburgh which he gave to the town. Katharine Augusta Oliver opened the house in 1930. Oliver died on 3 June 1934 at Edgerston aged 70 and was buried in the local churchyard.

== Major works ==
- Alexander Hamilton 1906
- Ordeal By Battle 1915
- The Endless Adventure 1930
- The Anvil of War: Letters Between F.S. Oliver and His Brother, 1914-1918 1936
