= The Monday Night Cabal =

The Monday Night Cabal was a ginger group of influential people set up in London by Leo Amery at the start of 1916 to discuss war policy. The nucleus of the group consisted of Lord Milner, George Carson, Geoffrey Dawson, Waldorf Astor and F. S. Oliver. The group got together for Monday night dinners and to discuss politics. Throughout 1916 their numbers and influence grew to include Minister of Munitions David Lloyd George, General Henry Wilson, Philip Kerr, and Mark Jameson. It is thought that word of the Ginger Group reached Douglas Haig, prompting him to invite Lord Milner to France in November for an 8-day tour of the Western Front. It was through the Ginger Group that Times editor Geoffrey Dawson published a December 4, 1916 news story titled "Reconstruction" that set in motion events that caused Prime Minister H. H. Asquith to resign, signaling the rise of the Lloyd George Ministry. Among the group's primary objectives was the formation of a small war cabinet within government to fight the war against the German Empire effectively. This point was advanced by The Times as early as April 1915, so it is unknown if the Ginger Group, or one its predecessor elements (most likely Times editor Geoffrey Dawson) was responsible for the idea behind Lloyd George's decision to create a War Cabinet on the day he was appointed prime minister. However, his surprise choice of Lord Milner as one of the War Cabinet's five members shows the influence of the ginger group on him.
