= Ginger group =

Advocacy group within another group

A ginger group is a formal or informal group within an organisation seeking to influence its direction and activity. The term comes from the phrase ginger up, meaning to enliven or stimulate. Ginger groups work to alter the organisation's policies, practices, or office-holders, while still supporting its general goals. Ginger groups sometimes form within the political parties of Commonwealth countries such as the United Kingdom, Canada, Australia, New Zealand, India, and Pakistan.

== The Monday Night Cabal ==
The Monday Night Cabal was a 'ginger group' of influential people set up in London by Leo Amery at the start of 1916 to discuss war policy. The nucleus of the group consisted of Lord Milner, George Carson, Geoffrey Dawson, Waldorf Astor and F. S. Oliver. The group got together for Monday night dinners and to discuss politics. Throughout 1916, their numbers and influence grew to include Minister of Munitions David Lloyd George, General Henry Wilson, Philip Kerr, and Mark Jameson. It was through the Ginger Group that Times editor Geoffrey Dawson published a December 4, 1916 news story titled "Reconstruction" that set in motion events that caused Prime Minister H. H. Asquith to resign, signalling the rise of the Lloyd George Ministry.

== Other examples ==
- Ginger Group, a group of left-wing Canadian MPs in the 1920s and early 1930s
- Ginger Group (Queensland)
- Kitchen Cabinet, a term used by political opponents of President of the United States Andrew Jackson to describe his ginger group
- League of Empire Loyalists, a 1950s UK ginger group
- Momentum, which has been described as a ginger group within the British Labour Party

== See also ==
- Entryism, a more militant tactic not always supporting general goals
- Political faction, a subgroup of a political party that has interests or opinions different from the rest of the political party
- Pressure group, an outside, as opposed to inside, group formed to influence the direction and activity of an organisation
