= The Great Divide (Hodson book) =

Book by H.V. Hodson

- Author: Harry Hodson
- Language: English
- Genre: Non-fiction
- Publisher: Oxford University Press
- Publication date: 1985
- ISBN: 9780195773408

The Great Divide is a book by H. V. Hodson, written on the subject of partition of British India (ISBN 9780195773408). The book is published by Oxford University Press.
