= The Round Table (journal) =

- Discipline: International relations
- Language: English
- Edited by: Sue Onslow

Publication details
- History: 1910–present
- Publisher: Routledge

Standard abbreviations
- ISO 4: Round Table

Indexing
- ISSN: 0035-8533 (print); 1465-4008 (web)
- OCLC no.: 01764559

Links
- Journal homepage

The Round Table: The Commonwealth Journal of International Affairs and Policy Studies is an academic journal established in 1910 relating to the international relations of the Commonwealth of Nations.

== History ==
The journal was established in 1910 as an off-shoot of the Round Table movement, established the previous year to promote closer union between the United Kingdom and its self-governing colonies. It was initially subtitled, 'A Quarterly Review of the Politics of the British Empire'. Though some of those associated with the Round Table movement promoted Imperial Federation, a proposal to create a federated union in place of the existing British Empire, it was early on agreed that the journal 'should not come out flat-footed' in favour of constitutional change, and disagreements within the Round Table movement meant that it never did.

It was founded by Lord Milner, former High Commissioner for South Africa, Lord Selborne, his successor, and members of "Milner's Kindergarten", who were associated with Milner through their work in the South African Civil Service, including:

- Lionel Curtis
- Philip Kerr – Liberal politician and, later, British Ambassador to United States
- Geoffrey Dawson – Times journalist
- Robert Brand

They were soon joined by others including Leo Amery, F.S. Oliver, and Alfred Zimmern.

In line with the developing idea of the British Empire turning into a 'Commonwealth' promoting progressive self-government, which emerged from the 'studies' of the Round Table movement, the sub-title of the journal was changed in 1919 to 'A Quarterly Review of the Politics of the British Commonwealth'.

Post-World War II, its subtitle was altered to 'A Quarterly Review of British Commonwealth Affairs' to reflect the changing nature of the Commonwealth and the lesser concentration on the domestic politics of Commonwealth member states. It became less a journal espousing a particular view and more a forum to exchange opinions. Its sub-title was changed again in 1966, to 'The Commonwealth Quarterly'.

The journal temporarily ceased in 1982 but was revived in 1983 with its current sub-title.

== Journal content ==
Until 1966 all articles in the journal were anonymous, ostensibly so that people in positions of authority could write frankly without fear of the consequences. Most of the authors of articles prior to 1966 have been identified, and included Lord Balogh, Sir Evelyn Baring, Sir Alexander Cadogan, Isaac Deutscher, Lord Gladwyn, Lord Hankey, Elspeth Huxley, T. E. Lawrence, Sir Harry Luke, Ali A. Mazrui, Sir Lewis Namier, Lionel Robbins, Garfield Todd, Arnold Toynbee, and Sir Frederick Whyte. An index to all news stories and authors from 1910 to 1966 can be found here.

From 1910 until the 1960s the journal carried regular news and analysis contributed by the Round Table groups in Canada, Australia, New Zealand, and South Africa. There were also regular articles from India, from 1918 the United States, from 1921 the Irish Free State, and after the Second World War Pakistan, Ceylon, Southern Rhodesia, and east Africa. These regular contributions all petered out in the 1960s.

Since 1983 the journal has included a regular 'Commonwealth Update' section, summarising political and other developments across the Commonwealth. This was written for many years by Derek Ingram. The current Update editor is Oren Gruenbaum.

Since 2012 the journal has included a regular 'Opinion' section, comprising shorter and usually policy-relevant pieces.

== Other activities ==
The Round Table runs a website which provides news and commentary on Commonwealth topics, additional to what is published in the journal. The current editor is Debbie Ransome.

The editorial board of the journal organises occasional conferences and public meetings on Commonwealth matters, usually including a one-day public conference in the UK before each CHOGM, and a two-day residential conference after. Reports are published on the website.

In addition to the editorial board in the UK and an international advisory board drawn from across the Commonwealth, there are 'chapters' of the journal in Australia, Bangladesh, India, and Malaysia, which organise their own activities.

The Round Table annually awards a Harry Hodson prize for a publishable article by anyone aged 30 years or younger as on 31 December of the year in which the article is submitted, and a Peter Lyon prize, for the best policy-relevant article published in each calendar year.

From 2009 to 2018, the Round Table, in association with its publisher, Routledge, funded a Routledge/Round Table Studentship, for a student from a Commonwealth country other than the UK, studying for the MA in Human Rights at the Institute of Commonwealth Studies, University of London, Since 2019 it has funded two annual Routledge/Round Table Commonwealth Studentships for doctoral students, one for a UK-based student and the other for a student from another Commonwealth country.

== List of editors ==
- 1910–16: Philip Kerr
- 1917–19: Reginald Coupland (Oxford University)
- 1919–20: Geoffrey Dawson
- 1921–34: John Dove
- 1934–39: Henry Vincent Hodson
- 1939–41: Reginald Coupland
- 1941: Geoffrey Crowther
- 1941–42: Henry Brooke
- 1942–44: Geoffrey Dawson
- 1945–65: Dermot Morrah
- 1965–70: Leonard Beaton
- 1970-71: Michael Howard and Robert V. Jackson
- 1972–75: Robert Jackson
- 1975–79: Alexander MacLeod
- 1979–81: Evan Charlton
- 1982: publication suspended
- 1983–2004: Peter Lyon
- 2004–08: Andrew Williams
- 2009–24: Venkat Iyer (University of Ulster)
- 2025–present: Sue Onslow
