= Macadam Cup =

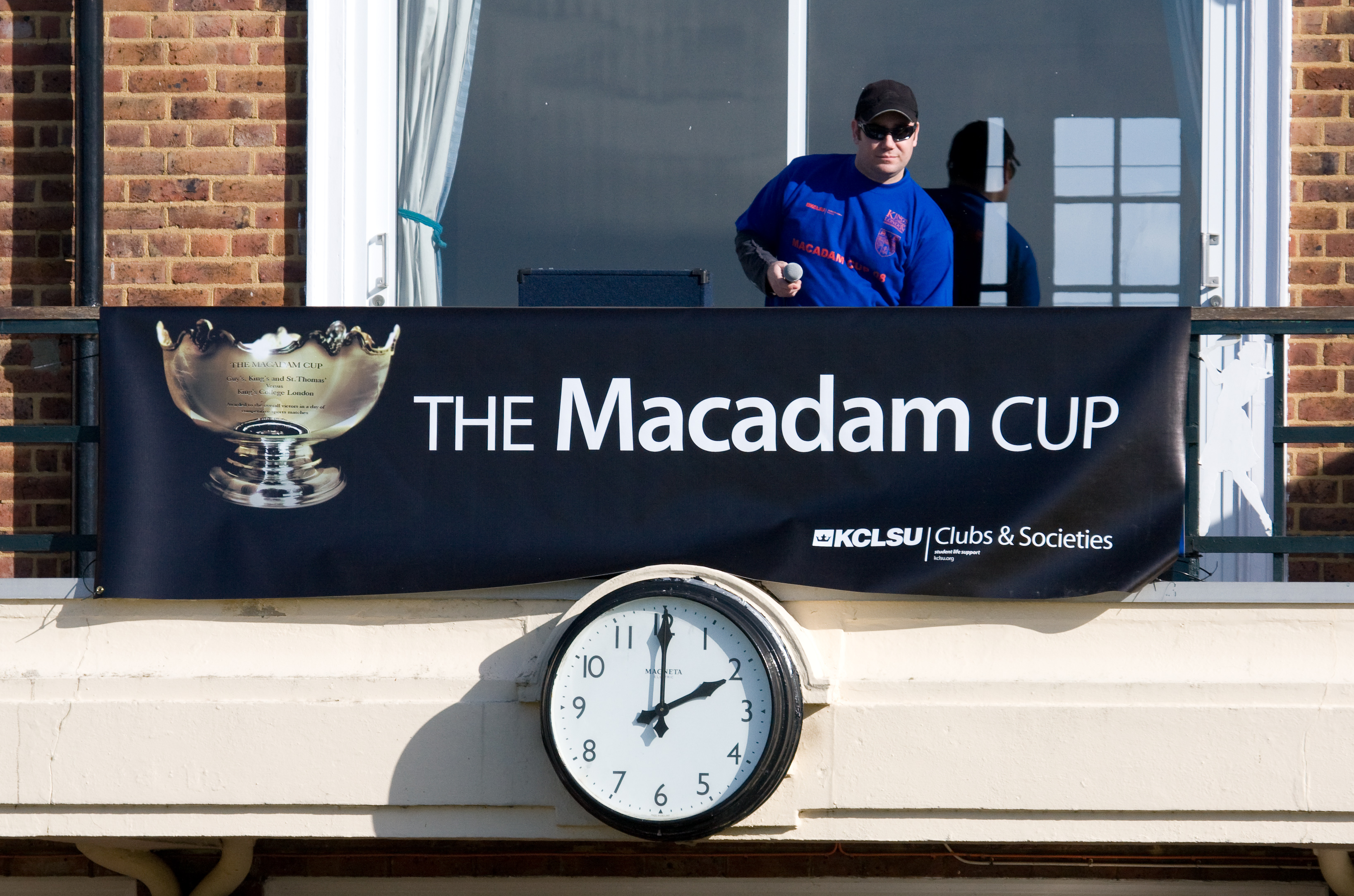
- "The Macadam Cup" banner from the 2008 competition.
- Teams: King's College London; Guy's, King's and St. Thomas' School of Medicine
- First meeting: 2004
- Trophy: The Macadam Cup

Statistics
- Most wins: Guy's, King's and St. Thomas' School of Medicine

The Macadam Cup is a varsity match played between the sports teams of King's College London proper (KCL) and Guy's, King's and St. Thomas' School of Medicine (GKT). The championship is named in honour of Sir Ivison Macadam, an alumnus of King's. Macadam also gave his name to a building at the King's Strand Campus, the location of the students' union (King's College London Students' Union).

== History ==
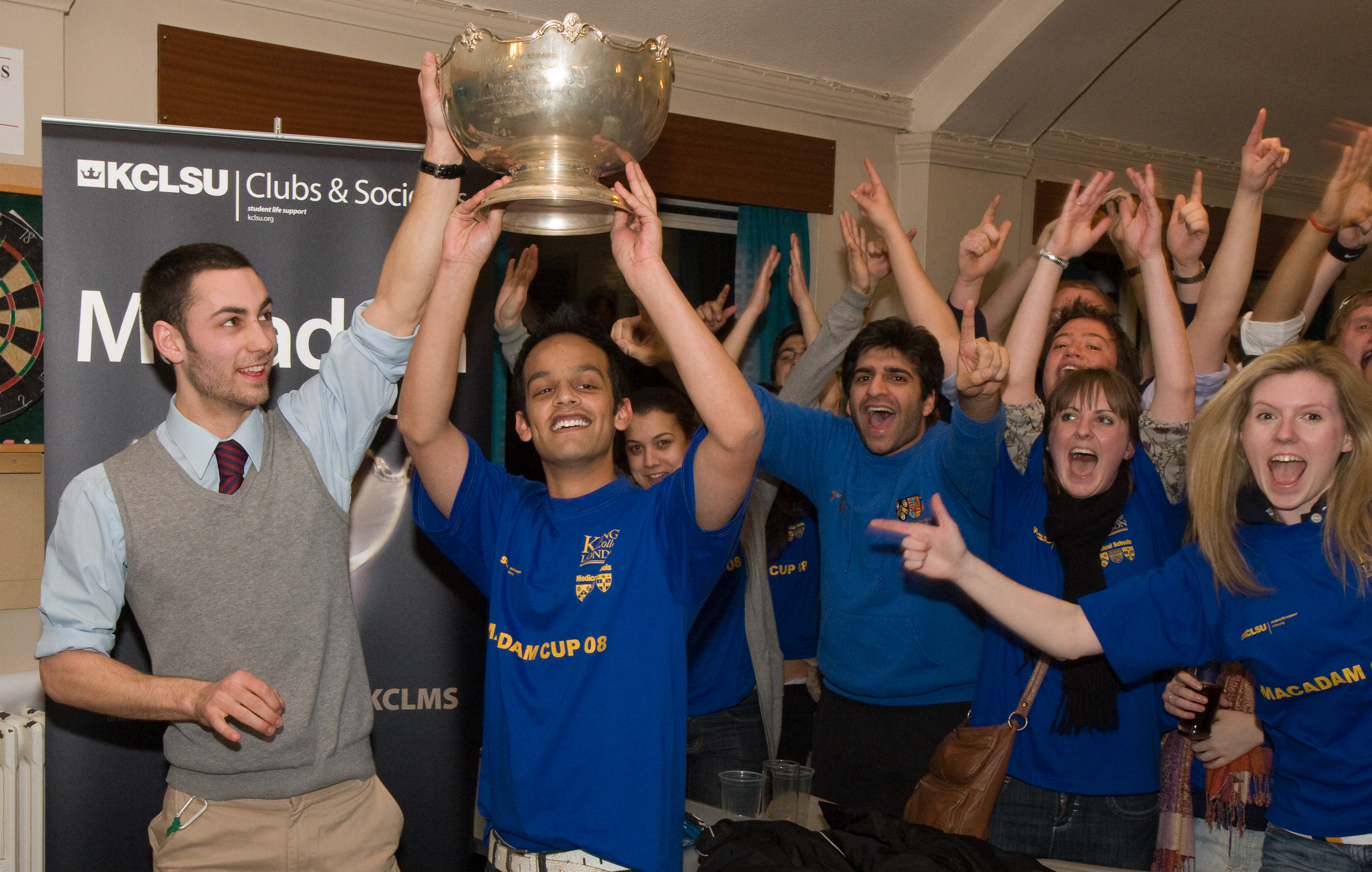
Tom AbouNader, KCLSU Vice-president Participation & Development, and Mihir Shah, captain of KCLMS Men's Hockey first team, lift the Macadam Cup after KCLMS won the 2008 competition.

The cup was first instituted in 2004 after an election pledge by the incoming President of the Students' Union, Michael Champion. The motivation behind the competition was not entirely focused on sports; Champion enjoyed large backing from the Health schools, and in a time where the political will of the college was to rebrand Guy's, King's and St. Thomas' (GKT) to KCLMS, Champion saw the event as an opportunity to enshrine GKT identity through the vehicle of a sporting event. The ulterior motive of the Macadam Cup was designed to make it increasingly difficult for Champion's successors to merge the GKT sports teams with the KCL ones.

== Sports ==
Since its conception, the Macadam Cup has grown in the number of sports contested. At present these include: Swimming gala, Water polo, Badminton, Squash, Hockey (men and women), Mixed fencing, Mixed tennis, Ultimate frisbee, Rugby (men and women), Netball, Lacrosse, Football (men and women) and Cricket.

Sports and presentations are held at Honor Oak Park Sports Ground with the day ending a Results night in KCLSU's Guys Bar and The Vault night clubs.

== Results ==
Year	Date held	Winner	Events won by KCL	Events won by GKT
2004	8 March	GKT	4	10
2005	22 March	GKT	3	17
2006	15 March	GKT	9	18
2007	21 March	GKT	5	7
2008	27 February	GKT	4	8
2009	25 March	GKT	6	9
2010	31 March	GKT	7	10
2011	30 March	KCL	7	6
2012	28 March	GKT	6	11
2013	27 March	GKT	8	9
2014	26 March	KCL	9	6
2015	25 March	GKT	6	9
2016	23 March	KCL	9.5	3.5
2017	29 March	GKT (4-1 on penalties)	8	8
2018	30 March	KCL	Score Unknown	Score Unknown
2019	27 March	GKT	6	10
2020	Not played due COVID19	-	-	-
2021	Not played due to COVID19	-	-	-
2022	4th April	GKT	6	9
2023	29th March	KCL	8	6
2024	27th March	GKT	5	8
2025	23rd April	GKT (Winner by Tie Break Tug of War)	6	6
2026	1st April	GKT	6	7

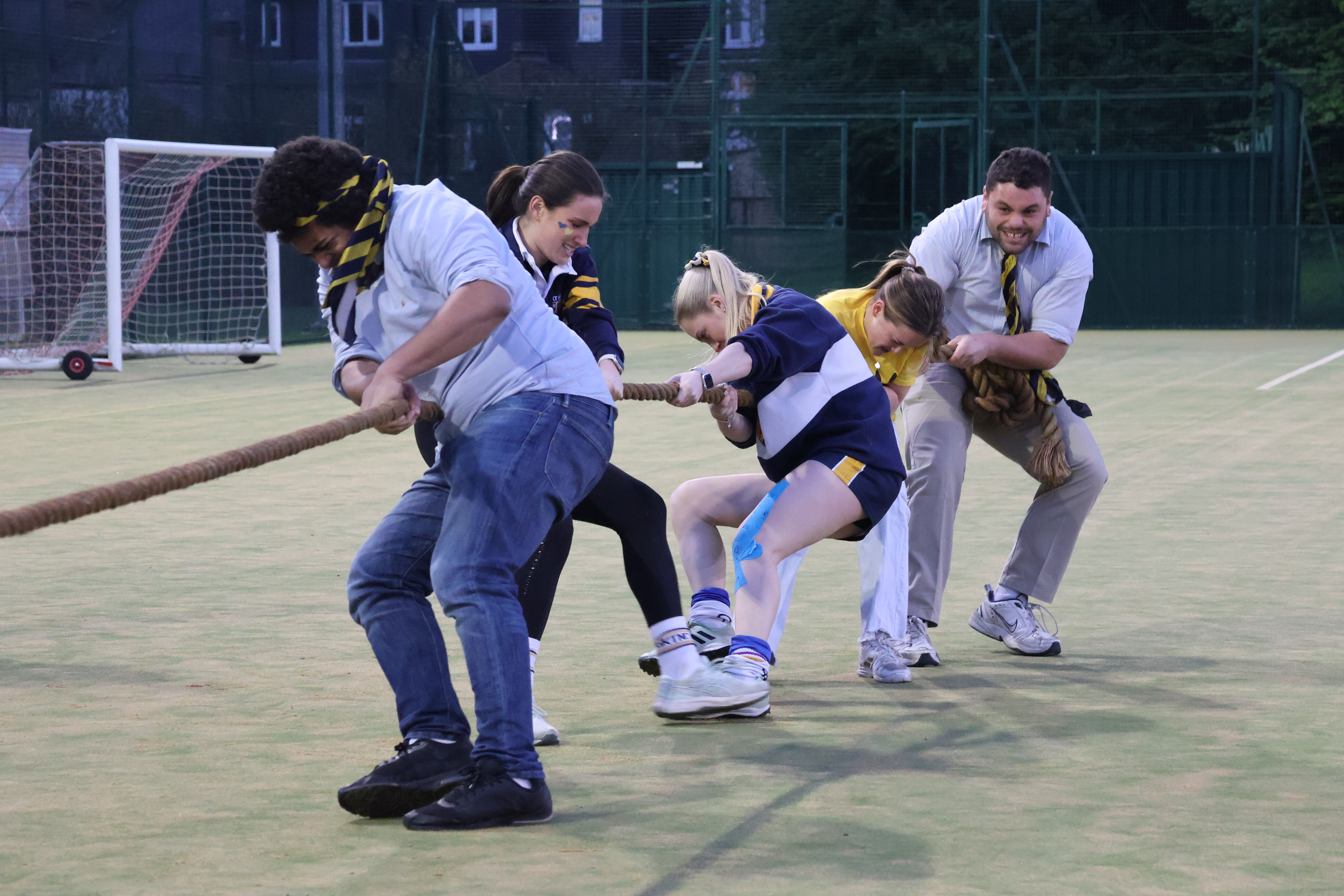
GKT 2025 Tie Break Tug of War Team

From its inauguration in 2004 to 2010, King's College London had yet to win the Macadam Cup, leading to chants of "You'll never win Macadam". In 2011, 2014 and 2016, and 2018 KCL won the Macadam Cup.

In the event of a tie, the Macadam Cup is ordinarily determined by a 'Tug of War'. In 2017, the winner of the cup was decided on football penalties, carried out by members of 5 different sports, which GKT won 4–1.

In 2025 the event was tied, decided by a tug of war, with 2 men and 3 women from each GKT and KCL sports taking part, which GKT won to secure the macadam cup again.

== See also ==
- List of British and Irish varsity matches
