= Derek Ingram =

Derek Thynne Ingram OBE (20 June 1925 – 17 June 2018) was a distinguished journalist and passionate supporter of the Commonwealth. In the 1960s he gave up a successful career as a newspaper editor to start a news service that would reflect the views of people in newly independent African countries and elsewhere in the developing world. He was on first name terms with leaders such as Indira Gandhi and Kenneth Kaunda, and was known to many as "Mr Commonwealth".

== Biography ==
The only child of a middle-class family, brought up in North London, Ingram was successful immediately after leaving Highgate School at the age of 16 during World War II. He was earning six guineas a week as a sub-editor on the Daily Sketch at the age of 17. He served as a signalman in the Navy, stationed until 1946 in Rome. After being demobbed, he joined the Daily Express, but in 1949 jumped ship to the Daily Mail, where he rose to deputy editor. He might have become editor, but his liberal politics and ferocious opposition to apartheid and racism in any form put him at odds with the paper's proprietor, Viscount Rothermere. Ingram resigned in 1966, but not before making his views known in Partners in Adventure, one of five books he authored. "Two problems above all torture our minds in this second half of the 20th century," he wrote. "The first is the atomic threat to our civilisation; the second the relationship between the black man and the white. The greatest single factor about the Commonwealth idea is that it transcends all racial barriers."

For Ingram, such views were not just theory. In 1967, he founded Gemini News Service, a syndication service that provided an alternative to wire services like Reuters by providing a platform for young journalists from the developing world. Gemini writers included a young Trevor McDonald in Trinidad who would go on to gain fame as a newsreader in the UK. A package of six articles, covering everything from politics to healthcare, education and art, copied on a Gestetner machine, was sent out by mail twice a week, Ingram himself stuffing the envelopes alongside a small, overworked staff. Because of Gemini, newspaper readers in Malaysia, for example, could read articles by journalists from Kenya and vice versa. Gemini pioneered the use of graphics and explanatory maps, which later became standard in newspapers. For many young reporters it was an opportunity to be published that they could get nowhere else, and Ingram would champion young reporters, especially those who came from Commonwealth countries where journalism was in its infancy. Ingram's legacy includes the CJA/Derek Ingram Fellowship, a fund administered as part of Wolfson College's Press Fellowship Programme in Cambridge UK, to support the personal and professional development of early career journalists focused on the Commonwealth.

While running Gemini, Ingram continued to report on the Commonwealth, covering 20 CHOGMs – Commonwealth Heads of Government Meetings – stopping only when ill health intervened in his late 1980s. He was amongst the last foreign correspondents to interview the Indian Prime Minister, Jawaharlal Nehru, before his death. He never name-dropped, but other journalists envied his access to post- Independence African leaders such as Julius Nyerere and Kenneth Kaunda, who would listen to Ingram's views on Commonwealth issues, knowing that he understood the politics better than almost anyone else. He also got to know Thabo Mbeki and other politicians who would go on to govern post-apartheid South Africa.

In 1978 Ingram co-founded the Commonwealth Journalists' Association, of which he remained President Emeritus after his retirement in 1990 until his death. He was a long-serving trustee on the board of the Commonwealth Institute in London. He received recognition from several Commonwealth bodies and in the 1998 Birthday Honours he was awarded an OBE in the Diplomatic List for services to Commonwealth journalism.

Ingram was a member of the Round Table Moot, having first attended a meeting of the Moot in 1971. Until 2007 he wrote the "Commonwealth Update" in The Round Table Journal. He wrote extensively in the journal, including its coverage of Commonwealth Heads of Government Meetings, having attended every one since 1971. He was a vice-president of the Royal Commonwealth Society. Ingram never married, nor had children, though he relished strong friendships across generations from around the world. He loved theatre, music and art and collected anything notable that was printed or published from postage stamps to newspapers, magazines, books and theatre programmes. Cultured, he boasted nonetheless that he had never been in control of a wheel in his life. He neither drove a car nor rode a bicycle. For decades he would always walk from his house in a quiet mews in Marylebone to his office and to meetings all over central London, and at a cracking pace. Right up until the last few months of his life, he would read the newspapers every morning and watch Channel 4 News at 7pm, proud to see one of his Gemini proteges, Lindsey Hilsum, reporting from around the world.

"Eventually the peoples of the world must be colour-blind," he wrote in 1965. "The Commonwealth is there as an instrument to this end, and all of us must try to use it." While others denigrated it as a diplomatic talking shop, or an association of rogues, Ingram, like Queen Elizabeth II, believed in the Commonwealth as a force for good.

He died on 17 June 2018 at the age of 92.

Media offices
Preceded by Mike Randall	Deputy Editor of the Daily Mail; 1964–1967	Succeeded by Bruce Rothwell
