= Ivison Macadam =

Scottish founder of the NUS (1894–1974)

Sir Ivison Macadam KCVO CBE FRSE
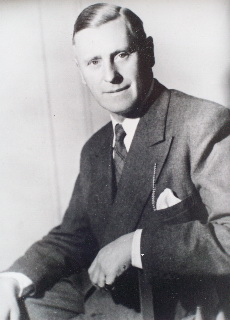

1st President National Union of Students
- In office 1922–1922
- Succeeded by: A Gordon Bagnall

1st Director-General Royal Institute of International Affairs
- In office 1929–1955

Personal details
- Born: Ivison Stevenson Macadam; 18 July 1894 Edinburgh, Scotland
- Died: 22 December 1974 (aged 80) London, England
- Spouse: Caroline Ladd Corbett
- Education: Melville College, Edinburgh; King's College, London; Christ's College, Cambridge

Sir Ivison Stevenson Macadam KCVO CBE CStJ FRSE FKC (18 July 1894 – 22 December 1974) was the first Director-General of the Royal Institute of International Affairs (Chatham House), and the founding President of the National Union of Students.

He was also the editor and chairman of the advisory board of the Annual Register of World Events; a longtime member of the editorial board of the Round Table and sat on the governing bodies of King's College, London and other organisations.

== Early life ==
Born 18 July 1894 at Slioch, Lady Road, Edinburgh, he was the second son of Colonel William Ivison Macadam, (1856–1902), and Sarah Maconochie MacDonald (1855–1941). He was the grandson of Stevenson Macadam, (1829–1901).

Educated at Melville College, Edinburgh, he was the second King's Scout to be invested in Scotland, and the first Silver Wolf Scout in Scotland, awarded for "services of the most exceptional character by gift of the Chief Scout". He was invested by Chief Scout and founder Sir Robert Baden-Powell.

== World War One ==
He served in World War I, attached to the City of Edinburgh (Fortress) Royal Engineers. He was the youngest major in the British Army as Officer Commanding Royal Engineers, Archangel, North Russian Expeditionary Force, the ill-fated Allied military campaign 1918–1919 following the armistice with Germany, and the final major military action of WWI (Mentioned in dispatches [MID] three times). He was awarded the OBE in 1919 at the age of 24 for his service there.

== University education ==
Ivison, like many of his generation who served in World War I, attended university at a later age than normal after his wartime service. He studied at King's College London and Christ's College, Cambridge.

== National Union of Students ==
He was the founder president of the National Union of Students, being elected their first president in 1922 when the Inter-Varsity Association and the International Students Bureau merged at a joint meeting held at the University of London. He was the then president of King's College Union Society.

After his experience in the First World War in an address to the British Association for the Advancement of Science he stated his vision of the role that the NUS would play.

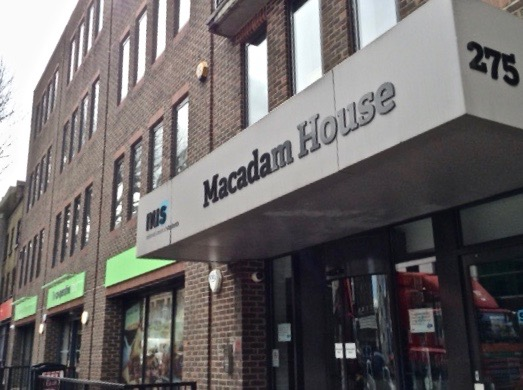
Macadam House, the present NUS Headquarters opened in 2013 at 275 Gray's Inn Road, King's Cross, London

The Union is in no way a propagandist organisation, it is an association of students for the furtherance of students' interests. But spirit of service permeates the movement and no one can fail to see how direct a bearing this national and international student co-operation must have on the great and pressing problems of reconstruction in Europe. If students are co-operating today surely there is hope for tomorrow.

The NUS's founding constitution stipulated that it must operate as a non-political and non-religious student organisation as the factional differences among nations were felt to have led to the recent world conflict. The non-political stipulation was dropped in 1969.

From its outset the NUS founders were also noteworthy in ensuring that women were involved at its highest levels through a constitutional requirement.

Macadam was involved in the formation Confédération Internationale des Étudiants (International Confederation of Students) bringing together student bodies from the original member countries of the League of Nations, including the US, and subsequently others. The CIE inaugural conference was held in Prague in 1921. He chaired until 1929 the CIE's commission responsible for International Relations and Travel.

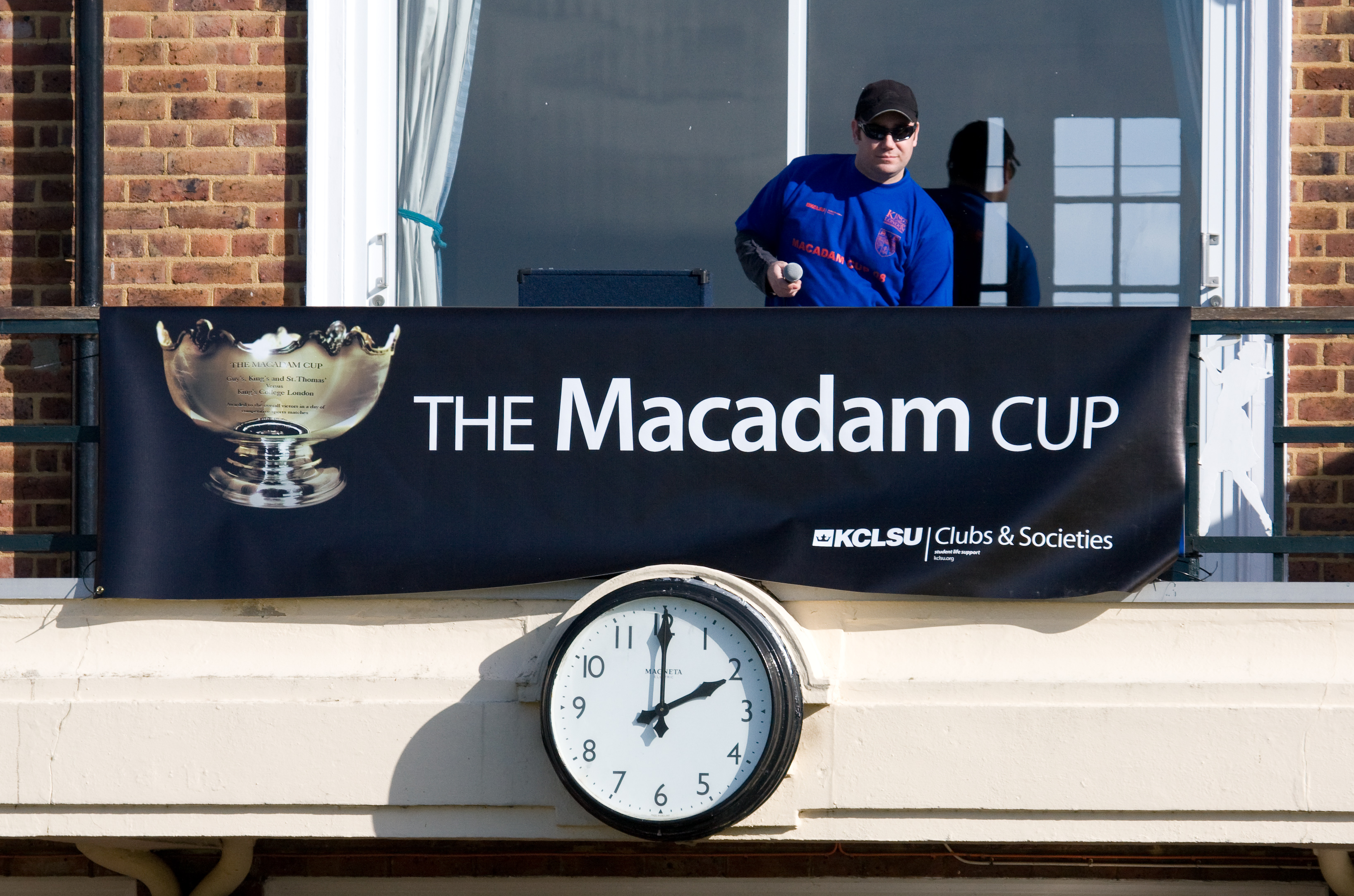
Macadam Cup 2008

He stepped down as the NUS President in December 1922 to serve as Honorary Organising Secretary, which became in effect their senior executive until 1929. While still at Cambridge, he was able to obtain the financing for a permanent headquarters for the NUS at Endsleigh Street, London, W.C.1.(opened in 1925). Its headquarters remained there until the properties were sold in 2010 to acquire their new building Macadam House at 275 Gray's Inn Road, London. In 1927 Macadam spearheaded a successful fundraising appeal to endow the Union and place it on a sound financial footing. He was one of the original trustees of the National Union of Students and remained one until the end of his life.

The main students' union building and Faculty of Engineering at King's College's Strand campus is named the Macadam Building in his honour (opened 1975).

In 2004, KCLSU President Michael Champion instituted the Macadam Cup, a day of sporting excellence between medical and non-medical students at the college.

A new NUS National Headquarters was named Macadam House in 2013 at 275 Gray's Inn Road, London, WC1X 8QB.

== Royal Institute of International Affairs (Chatham House) ==
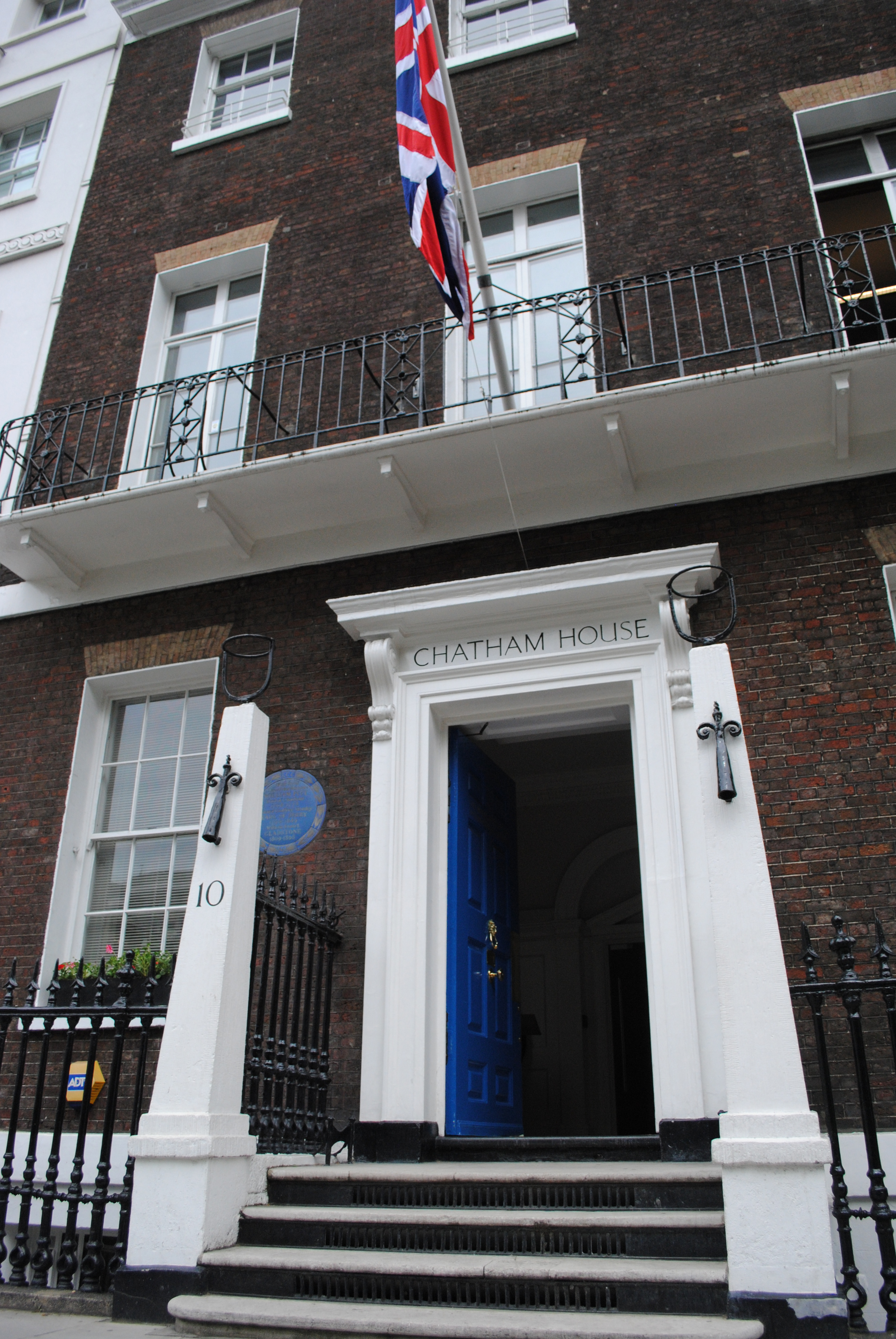
Chatham House, 10 St. James's Square, London

He was the first Secretary and Director-General of the Royal Institute of International Affairs serving as its chief executive between 1929 and 1955 based at Chatham House, 10 St. James's Square, London, S.W.1.

A London County Council blue plaque on Number 10 states "Here lived Three Prime Ministers WILLIAM PITT Earl of Chatham 1708–1778 Edward Geoffrey Stanley EARL OF DERBY 1799–1869 William Ewart GLADSTONE 1809–1898". The Grade I listed building designed by Henry Flitcroft in 1730s was named on its gifting to the institute after the first of these three Prime Ministers (Pitt the Elder) as Chatham House. Macadam oversaw the growth of the institute from William Pitt's former Cabinet Room where as Prime Minister Pitt had presided over his Cabinet overlooking St. James's Square located above the entrance hall.

To enable the institute to increase the breadth and range of its activities, Macadam steadily expanded office and meeting space for the Institute by acquiring the freehold properties adjoining 10, St James Square (Chatham House).

Macadam was responsible for numerous international conferences around the world. He organised the first Commonwealth Relations Conference at Hart House, University of Toronto, Canada in 1933 (the first Commonwealth conference per se).

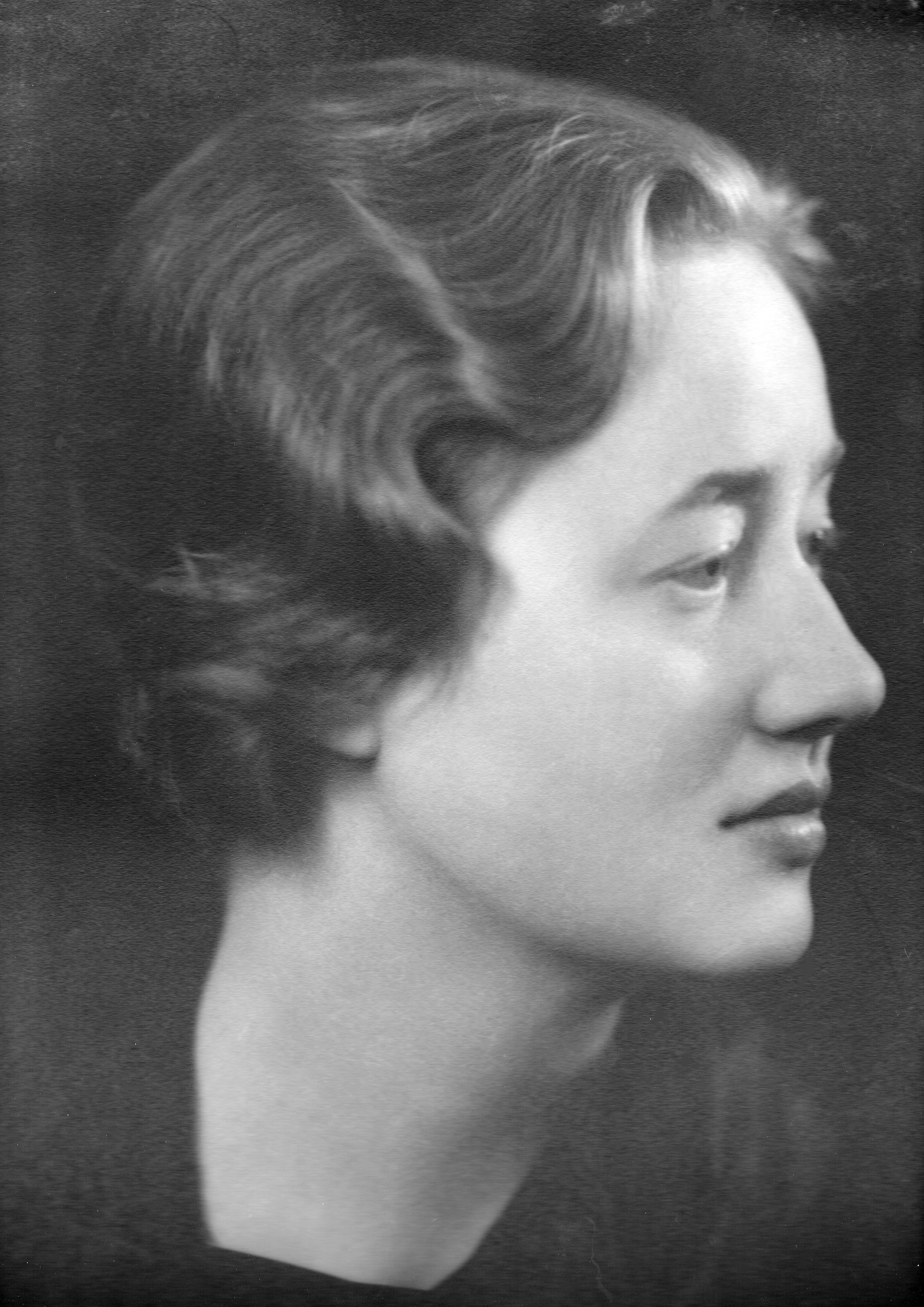
Caroline Ladd Corbett Macadam (Lady Macadam) 1910–1989

It was followed by him being responsible for other Commonwealth Relations conferences at Lapstone near Sydney, Australia in 1938, at Chatham House, London in 1945, at Lucknow, India in 1950, the capital of the Indian state of Uttar Pradesh, and at Lahore, Pakistan in 1954, the capital of the Pakistani province of Punjab. Also various Institute of Pacific Relations Conferences, including that at Banff, Canada (1933) followed by Yosemite, USA (1936). He was a participant in the Congress of Europe at The Hague, Netherlands in 1948.

He travelled to the British Dominions and helped the independent establishment of the various Commonwealth Institutes of International Affairs or where such bodies had earlier been established in both Australia and Canada to generate financial support from benefactors in order that they could have their own full-time secretariats. The Canadian Institute of International Affairs funding 1932 (now known as the Canadian International Council); the Australian funding 1934. The formation of the Institutes in New Zealand 1934; in South Africa 1934; in Indian 1936; in Pakistan 1947.

At Chatham House he is remembered for his Scottish drive and application ... He organised persons, events and work with equal stern objectivity.

— The Times, 24 December 1974

He was the institute's chief executive for a period of 25 years during which it grew from a promising pioneering experiment into a well established and internationally respected centre for the study and discussion of world affairs.

When asked who founded Chatham House, Ivison would reply with a list of distinguished people, among whom Lionel Curtis took pride of place, and would emphasise the great amount of time that they devoted in shaping the institute's policy in the early days. This no doubt was true, but it was Ivison who had to carry their ideas into practice, raise the money and recruit the staff.

He was a gifted promoter of Chatham House and its objectives, obtaining endowments in Britain and the Commonwealth and also gaining the support of the great American foundations, Carnegie, Rockefeller and later Ford. In this important American connection he was greatly helped by his American wife, Caroline, whose numerous friends in her own country opened many doors.

— The Times, 31 December 1974

…he was a most efficient organiser, but an organiser not only of administration and action but also of men and women, who worked with him and for him as loyally as he worked for their common enterprise. By profession an engineer, by circumstance of war a soldier, he brought to his life's work an engineer's concern for structure, a soldier's care for discipline with comradeship. Straightforward, without airs, he was essentially a practical man, who saw what needed to be done and did it, or saw that it was done.

— The Times, 6 January 1974.

== Ministry of Information ==
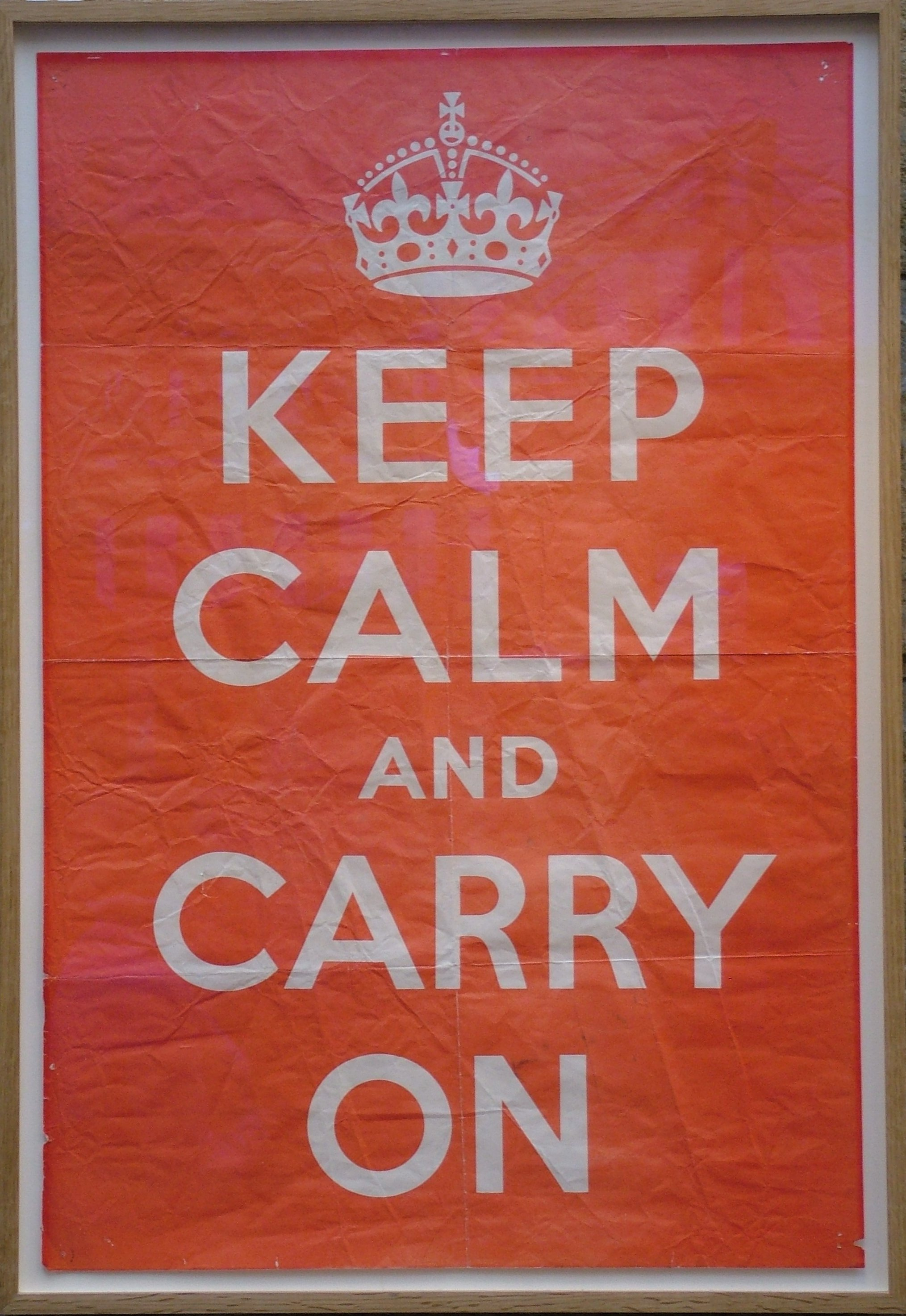
An early Ministry of Information poster Macadam was responsible for.

He was Assistant Director General and Assistant Secretary to the Ministry of Information during World War II between 1939 – 41.

His pre-war work from 1937 in forming the Ministry had to be unpublicised, but once war broke out part of the Ministry's wartime role became very obvious. Among the monikers it was given was Ministry of Morale. Among its most visual activities were the hundreds of different posters it produced throughout the war for use all over Britain on billboards, in the London Underground, in railway stations and elsewhere where people congregated. Among its most memorable today is one of its first that it is believed Macadam simply scribbled out as "Keep Calm and Carry On", and told the staff to make it look noticeable and official for use in the event of a major bombing campaign or large seaborne attack that was expected: a large number were printed in red with a crown at the top in 1939, but never actually used because of the unexpected initial quiet period of the Phoney War when it would not have made sense. An artistic department, employing professional poster designers, was subsequently established, and produced hundreds of morale-boosting posters throughout the rest of the war.

The ministry's other activities in overseeing broadcasting and censorship were less obvious.

Macadam returned to the Royal Institute in March 1941 to continue its war work and oversee the post-war international reconstruction planning there with the additional important support of the US Rockefeller Foundation.

== The Annual Register of World Events ==
He was the editor and the chairman of the advisory board of The Annual Register of World Events for twenty-six years, covering the years 1947–72. The Annual Register is the world's oldest continuously published annual reference book founded by Edmund Burke.

On assuming the role of Editor for the year 1947 he introduced an advisory board that he chaired to which various learned societies nominated a representative, such as the Arts Council of Great Britain, The British Association for The Advancement of Science, The Royal Institute of International Affairs, the Royal Historical Society, The English Association, and included the Editor of The World Today.

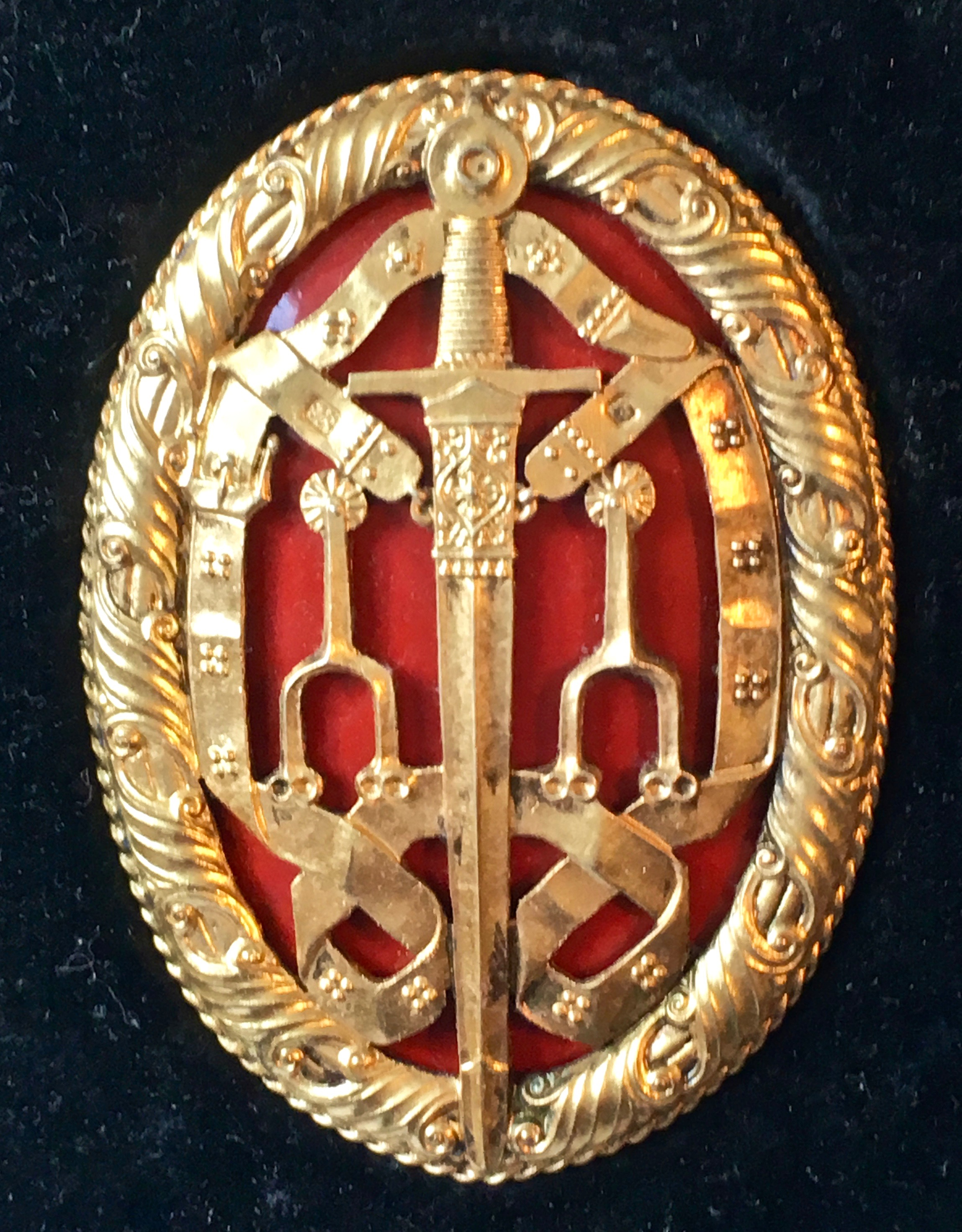
Ivison Macadam was knighted in 1955 upon his impending retirement from Chatham House. Sir Ivison's Knight Bachelor breast badge

This innovation of an advisory board has remained a component of The Annual Register ever since.

Former prime minister Harold Macmillan told Macadam's succeeding editor that he could never have written his memoirs without reference to the Annual Register.

The Annual Register had undoubtedly been used by many in writing their memoirs; however, when Winston Churchill was a young subaltern in India and yet to obtain high office, he asked his mother to send him as many volumes of The Annual Register from previous years that she could find. He read these and annotated them with his criticisms or his views on improvements of prior prime minister's speeches or policies written in the margins. For a future world statesman this was obviously an ingenius way to educate himself about world affairs and politics. His marked up volumes of The Annual Register are today in the Churchill Archives at Cambridge University.

After overseeing 26 annual editions Macadam retired as the editor of The Annual Register in 1972.

He put the Annual Register on a sound financial footing and strengthened its worldwide reputation by bringing in a wide range of specialist contributors. Sales expanded considerably, particularly in the United States.

— The Times, 24 December 1974

== The Round Table ==
He was a member (1930–1974) of the editorial body (the Moot) of The Round Table: A quarterly Review of the Politics of the British Commonwealth as it was known at the time (now The Round Table:The Commonwealth Journal of International Affairs). Britain's oldest international journal. He served as the Round Table's Honorary Secretary in the postwar years.

== King's College London ==
He was elected a Fellow of King's College London in 1939, and served as a member of the King's College Council 1957–74; its Delegacy 1960–74; a member of its Finance Committee, and on many special sub-committees both to the Delegacy and Council and as its vice-chairman 1971–74. On his election Macadam preposed that two students nominated by their peers sit on the governing body. This was adopted and King's was one of the first universities to follow this practise.

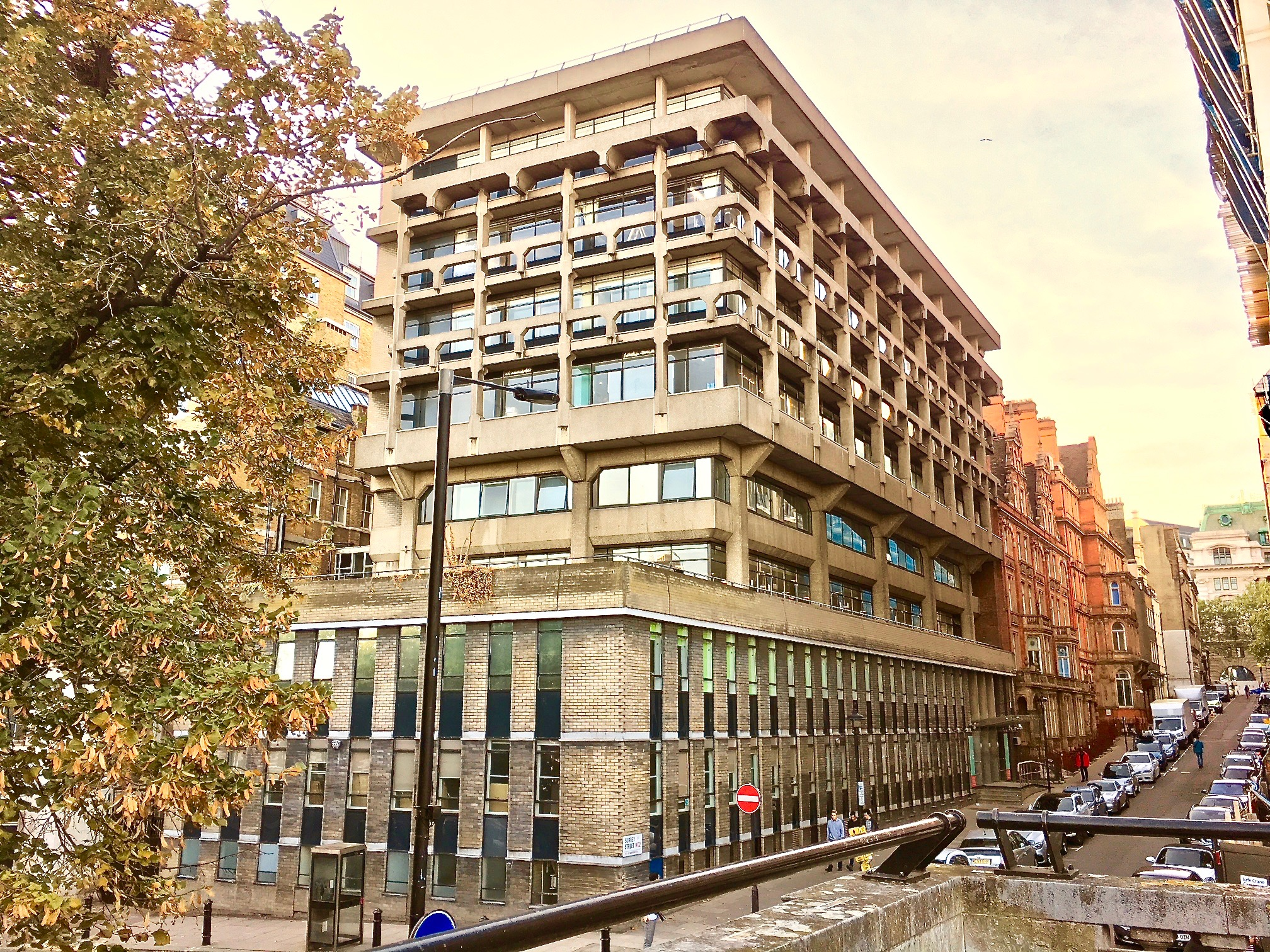
The Macadam Building, King's College London, opened in 1975 on the Embankment with entrance on Surrey Street which runs south from the Strand. The building faces the National Theatre across the Thames

On his retirement as vice-chairman in 1974 the Delegacy minutes of 15 January 1974 recorded his service to King's:

In 1919, at the age of 25, Ivison Macadam entered the Faculty of Engineering at King’s College as a student. With a distinguished war service from 1914–19, including command of the Royal Engineers in the Archangel Expeditionary Force, he brought to College the experience and maturity which characterised many young ex-servicemen of both world wars. At King's these qualities were quickly recognised by his election as President of the Union Society, and in a wider context of student life when he became the Founder President, and later Trustee of the National Union of Students.

After taking his degree he remained an unfailing supporter of all college activities during the difficult years of the thirties, and in 1939 was elected a Fellow. Knighted in 1955 Sir Ivison was appointed a member of the council in 1957 and three years later he became a member of the Delegacy. Since then he has served as its Vice-Chairman, as a member of its Finance Committee, and on many special sub-committees both of the Delegacy and Council.

A close association of fifty-five years with one's own College is a rare achievement. When that half century has been notable for constant devotion to its interests, based on both understanding and affection, the achievement is doubly rare.

In return Sir Ivison has evoked the affection he has given. At all meetings of both governing bodies and as chairman of sub-committees his advice has been sought and valued. His firm kindly manner, his robust presence and his Scottish clarity combined to make him one of the most permanent and respected figures in College life.

His resignation from the Delegacy is received both with a sense of severe loss and a sense of deep gratitude.

== Royal service ==
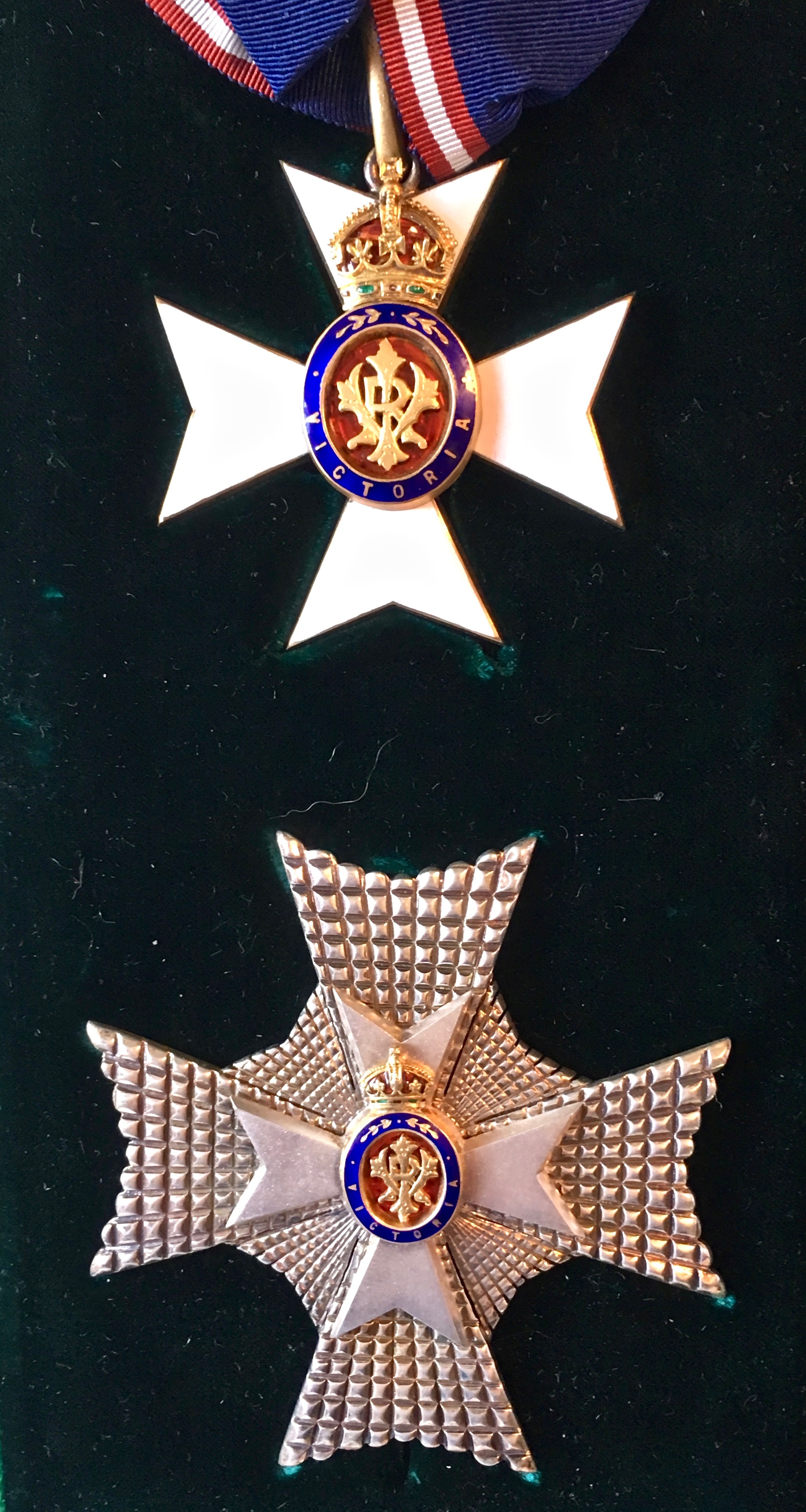
Knight Commander of the Royal Victorian Order (KCVO). Sir Ivison was elevated by Queen Elizabeth II to a knight of the order in 1974.

He was a founding member of the council, King George's Jubilee Trust (for youth) on which he served from 1935 to 1974, first under the Chairmanship of the Prince of Wales, until he ascended to the throne as Edward VIII; then under the chairmanship of Duke of York, until he ascended to the throne on the abdication of his brother as George VI and then under the chairmanship of the King's brother, Prince Henry, Duke of Gloucester, under whom he served as vice-chairman (1972–74), when the Duke was suffering from ill health, until Prince Charles had finished his naval service and was able to take over as chairman. It is now run under the umbrella of The Prince's Trust under the Chairmanship of the Prince of Wales.

Macadam was responsible for devising the concept of, creating, editing and organising the printing and distribution of the official royal programs to be published under the auspices of the King George's Jubilee Trust.

The programs published the details of the processions and order of service for King George V and Queen Mary's Jubilee, 1935; the Coronation of their Majesties King George VI and Queen Elizabeth, 1937; the wedding of the Princess Elizabeth and Lt. Philip Mountbatten, RN, 1947; the Coronation of Queen Elizabeth II, 1953; the wedding of the Princess Margaret and Anthony Armstrong-Jones,1960 and the wedding of the Princess Alexandra of Kent and Angus Ogilvy, 1963.

They were sold on behalf of King George's Jubilee Trust mainly along the parade routes on the day of the event by the Boy Scouts but also prior to it in newsagents and bookshops. The substantial additional funds thus raised helped support the work of King George's Jubilee Trust in aiding young people, youth organisations and youth projects.

== Other roles ==
Other voluntary roles included:

- Chairman 1960–72 (later Deputy President) of the Victoria League for Commonwealth Friendship
- Commander, County of Norfolk St. John Ambulance Brigade 1958–1972; President 1972–74
- Chairman of the Board of Governors, Runton Hill School 1960–72

== Personal life ==
When Macadam was only seven, his father was shot and killed by a mentally disturbed gunman in an Edinburgh tragedy in 1902.

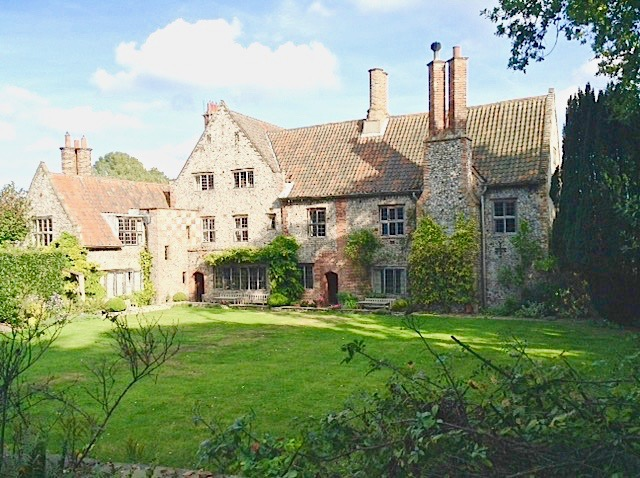
The Ivison Macadams' home Runton Old Hall, Norfolk

In 1938 he married, Caroline Ladd Corbett, who was born and raised in Portland, Oregon USA (Born 20 September 1910 at Portland, Multnomah Co. Died on 28 August 1989 in East Runton, Norfolk). Her parents were Elliott Ruggles Corbett (1884–1963) and Alta Smith Corbett (1886–1976). Caroline was the great-granddaughter of two of Portland's pioneers (Henry W. Corbett and William S. Ladd). Before her marriage, she was Assistant to the US Secretary of State, Henry L. Stimson, and the couple met at the IPR's international conference that Macadam had arranged at Banff, Canada in 1933.

After their marriage, she was of invaluable support to her husband in his professional life and in assisting him to raise the substantial funding required for the operations of the RIIA. She was later Chairman of the Eastern Counties Women's Conservative Associations.

The couple had four children: Helen Ivison Macadam (who married 1. Ian Wightwick M.C., 2. The Rev. Roger Taylor), William Ivison Macadam, Elliott Corbett Macadam and Caroline Alta Macadam (who is married to Francesco Colacicchi and writes under the name of Alta Macadam). The couple lived in London and at Runton Old Hall, East Runton, Norfolk. Macadam was a keen sportsman, shot and fly fisherman.

== Honours and decorations ==
- Officer of the Order of the British Empire (OBE), 1919 – Military Division
- Victory Medal (United Kingdom) with oak leaf MID (Mentioned in dispatches three times), 1919
- Order of Saint Anna (Russian Order), 2nd class with swords (for bravery in battle), 1919
- British War Medal, 1920
- Territorial Force War Medal, 1920

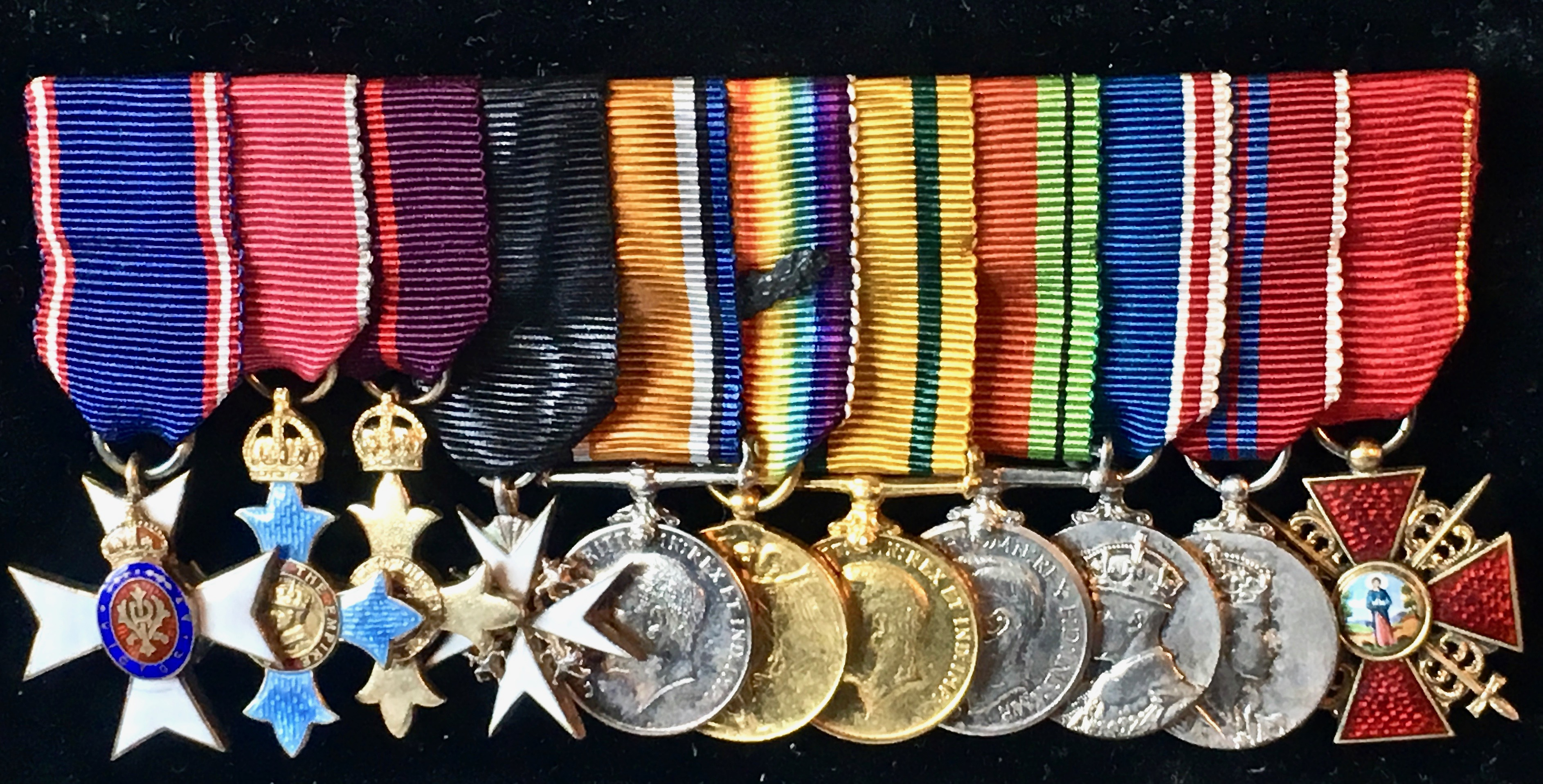
His decorations and medals (L-R) CVO, CBE (Civil), OBE (Military), CStJ, British War Medal, Victory Medal with oak leaf (for mention in dispatches), Territorial Force War Medal, Defence Medal, George VI Coronation Medal, Elizabeth II Coronation Medal, Order of Saint Anna (Russia) 2nd Class with swords

- Commander of the Order of the British Empire (CBE), 1935 – Civil Division
- King George V Silver Jubilee Medal, 1935
- Member of the Royal Victorian Order (MVO), 1937
- King George VI Coronation Medal, 1937
- Defence Medal (United Kingdom), 1945
- Commander of the Royal Victorian Order (CVO), 1953
- Queen Elizabeth II Coronation Medal, 1953
- Knight Bachelor, (Kt.) 1955
- Commander of the Order of St John (CStJ), c.1965
- Knight Commander of the Royal Victorian Order (KCVO), 1974
- Fellow of King's College, London (FKC), 1939
- Fellow of the Royal Society of Edinburgh (FRSE), 1945
- Member of the Institution of Mechanical Engineers (MIMechE)

== Death ==
He died on 22 December 1974, at his London home at 16 Upper Belgrave Street, London.

He is buried with his wife next to his father in Portobello Cemetery in Edinburgh.

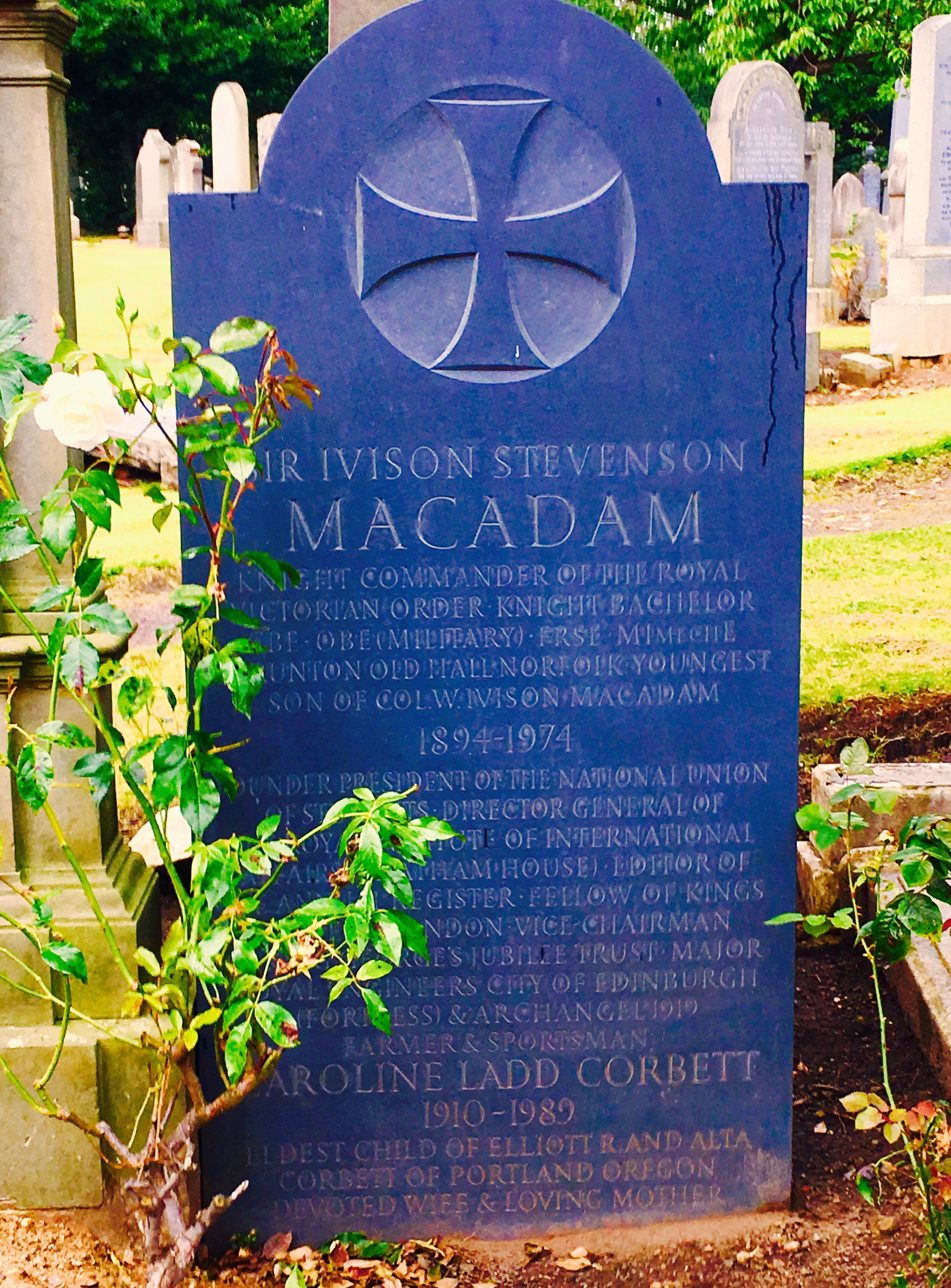
Sir ivison & Lady Macadam gravestone, Portobello Cemetery, Edinburgh, Scotland

The inscription reads:

SIR IVISON STEVENSON MACADAM

Knight Commander of the Royal Victorian Order, Knight Bachelor, CBE, OBE (military), FRSE, MImechE. Of Runton Old Hall Norfolk. Youngest Son of Col. W. Ivison Macadam.
1894–1974

Founder President of the National Union of Students. Director General of The Royal Institute of International Affairs (Chatham House). Editor of the Annual Register. Fellow of King's College London. Vice Chairman of King George's Jubillee Trust. Major Royal Engineers City of Edinburgh (Fortress) & Archangel 1919. Farmer and Sportsman.

His wife's inscription immediately below reads:

CAROLINE LADD CORBETT

1910 – 1989
Eldest child of Elliott R and Alta Corbett of Portland Oregon.

Devoted Wife and Loving Mother.

The grave lies midway along the original eastern path (before the eastern extension) in Portobello Cemetery beside that of his father Col. William Ivison Macadam and near that of his grandfather Stevenson Macadam around 20m to the north.

His grave memorial was designed and lettering was carved by Michael Harvey MBE. Lady Macadam's inscription below her husband's was by Dick Reid OBE.

== Archive Sources ==
- King's College London Archives Macadam collection.
- Royal Institute of International Affairs (Chatham House) Archives, London.
- Bodleian Libraries, University of Oxford: Archive of The Round Table (incl. correspondence and papers of Ivison Macadam, 1934–1971).
- Bodleian Libraries, University of Oxford: Archive of Lionel George Curtis.
- Council on Foreign Relations Archives, Harold Pratt House, 58 East 68th Street, New York: Royal Institute of International Affairs (Ivison Macadam).
- Columbia University Libraries, New York: Institute of Pacific Relations records, 1927–1962.
- University of British Columbia Archives, Vancouver: Institute of Pacific Relations fonds.
- The Annual Register Online Archives (ProQuest)
- Columbia University Libraries: Carnegie Corporation of New York records, circa 1872-2015: Royal Institute of International Affairs (Ivison Macadam)
- Rockefeller Archive Center, 15 Dayton Avenue, New York: Royal Institute of International Affairs (Ivison Macadam).
- University of Warwick, Modern Records Centre: Archive of National Union of Students (NUS).
- Ministry of Information archives. The National Archives, Kew, UK.
- Ministry of Information archives, The British Library.
- MOI Digital (https://moidigital.ac.uk) Partnered by University of London, King's College London, The National Archives.
