= Lionel Curtis =

British official and writer (1872–1955)

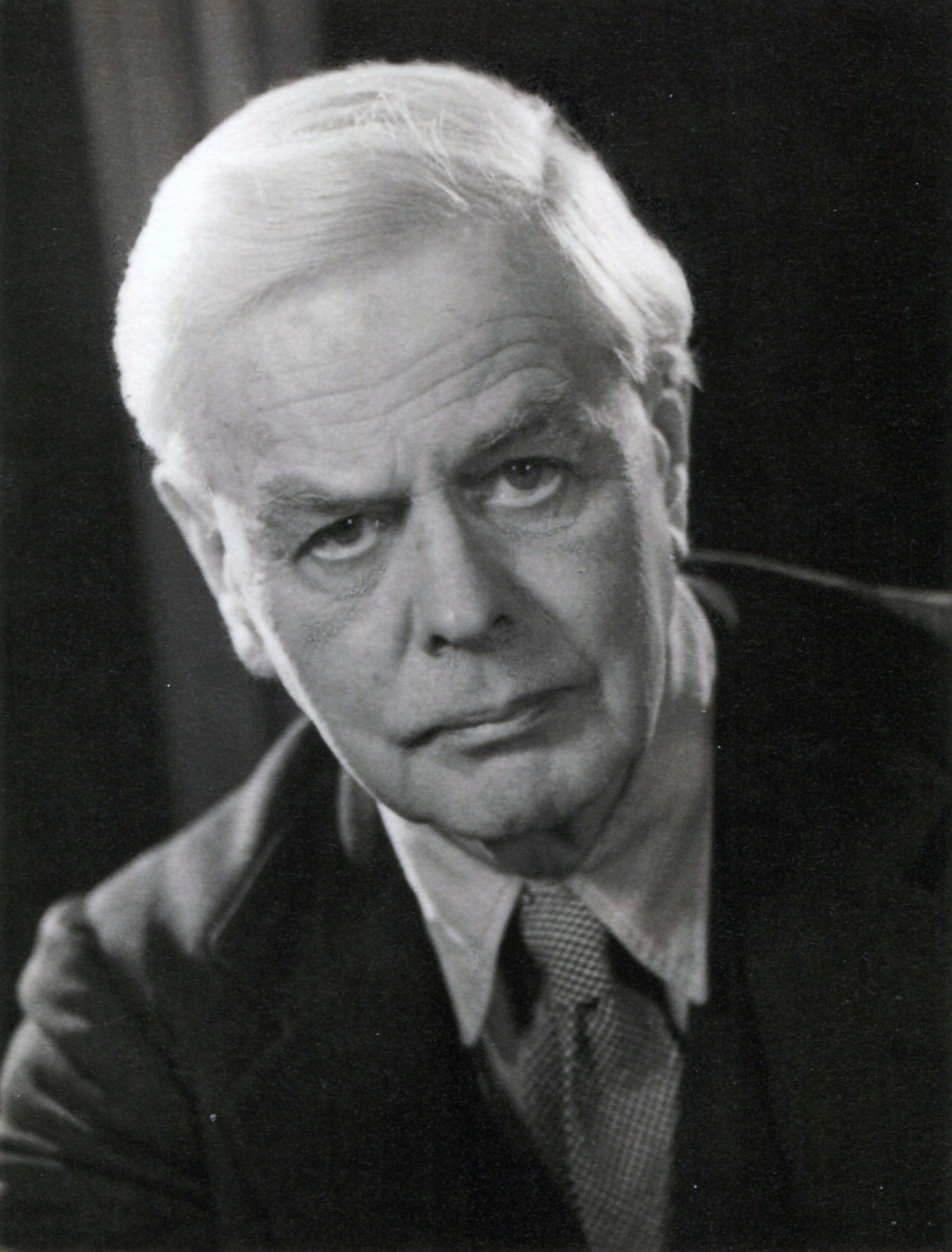
- Born: 7 March 1872; The Outwoods, Derby
- Died: 24 November 1955 (aged 83)
- Education: New College, Oxford
- Occupations: Professor, fellow of All Souls College
- Known for: Founding Chatham House and the Round Table

Lionel George Curtis (1872–1955) was a British internationalist and author. He was the inspiration for the foundation of Chatham House (The Royal Institute of International Affairs) as well as the US Council on Foreign Relations at the Paris Peace Conference in 1919. He was a leading member of Round Table movement. His writings and influence are associated with the emergence of the Commonwealth from the British Empire.

== Early life ==
Curtis was born in 1872 at The Outwoods, Derby, his mother's family home, and later moved to Coddington, Herefordshire, the youngest of the four children of George James Curtis, Anglican rector of the parish, and his wife Frances Carr, daughter of the Rev. John Edmund Carr. He was educated at Haileybury College and then at New College, Oxford, where he read law. He fought in the Second Boer War with the City Imperial Volunteers.

== Milner's Kindergarten ==
Curtis served as secretary to Lord Milner (a position that had also been held by adventure-novelist John Buchan), during which time he dedicated himself to working for a united self-governing South Africa. He, with a group of bright young men there, who would later make their mark in international roles, were called Milner's Kindergarten. Following Milner's death in 1925, Curtis became the second leader of Milner's Kindergarten until his own death in 1955.

== The Round Table ==
Curtis was an original founding member with Lord Milner of the Round Table Movement.

Curtis was also a founder (1910) the international quarterly The Round Table.

== Oxford University ==
He was appointed (1912) Beit lecturer in colonial history at the University of Oxford, and a Fellow of All Souls College.

== Chatham House and The Council on Foreign Relations ==
In 1919 Curtis made a proposal to the British and American delegates attending the Paris Peace Conference at a meeting on 30 May 1919 at the Hotel Majestic. Curtis addressed the meeting and strongly believed that the conference had illustrated the pressing need for the formation of an informed international research body for expert analysis of foreign affairs that could have advised on the matters the delegates had had before them and had been required to decide upon. Curtis's proposal to the meeting was that an Anglo-American "Institute of International Affairs" should be founded with offices in Britain and the US and this was warmly accepted by the British and United States delegates.

However, in the end it actually resulted in the formation of two sister organisations with the foundation of a British Institute, later the Royal Institute of International Affairs regularly now known as Chatham House, on 5 July 1920 in London and the Council on Foreign Relations in New York one year later on 29 July 1921.

In a revealing letter written 1932, Whitney Shepardson, a US delegate at the Peace Conference, a participant at the meeting at the Hotel Majestic and a founding member of the US Council on Foreign Relations wrote to Ivison Macadam at Chatham House about Curtis,

" He's like the Hound of Heaven. Or Jacob wrestling the angel. There was some talk at Council [on Foreign Relations] Directors' meeting today about Chatham House and its resources. Craveth said that Chatham House had been lucky in having one or two 'angels' to give it money. I said, 'Yes, but what's more important they had a Jacob in the shape of Lionel Curtis to wrestle with these angels saying "I will not let thee go until thou bless me!"'

Curtis remained a driving force within Chatham House and in international movements and conferences around the world until very late in his life but preferred to give credit to others.

== The Commonwealth ==
Curtis was largely the creator of the idea of Commonwealth as former British territories would transition into self governing nations (originally the British Commonwealth and now expanded as the Commonwealth of Nations)

== Other initiatives ==
Curtis had earlier advocated British Empire Federalism and, late in life, a world state.

His experience led him to conceptualise his early version of a Federal World Government.

His ideas concerning dyarchy were important in the development of the Government of India Act 1919.

He was involved in 1921-1922 the creation of The Irish Free State Treaty.

== Nominated for Nobel Peace Prize and made Companion of Honour ==
In 1947, Curtis was nominated for the Nobel Peace Prize; in 1949, he was appointed a Member of the Order of the Companions of Honour, on the thirtieth anniversary of the founding of Chatham House.

== Works ==
Curtis' most important works were:

- The Problem of the Commonwealth (London: Macmillan, 1915);
- The Commonwealth of Nations (1916);
- Dyarchy (1920); and,
- Civitas Dei: The Commonwealth of God (1938), arguing that the United States must rejoin the British commonwealth and that the Commonwealth must evolve into a world government.
