= William Basil Worsfold =

Barrister and author (1858–1939)

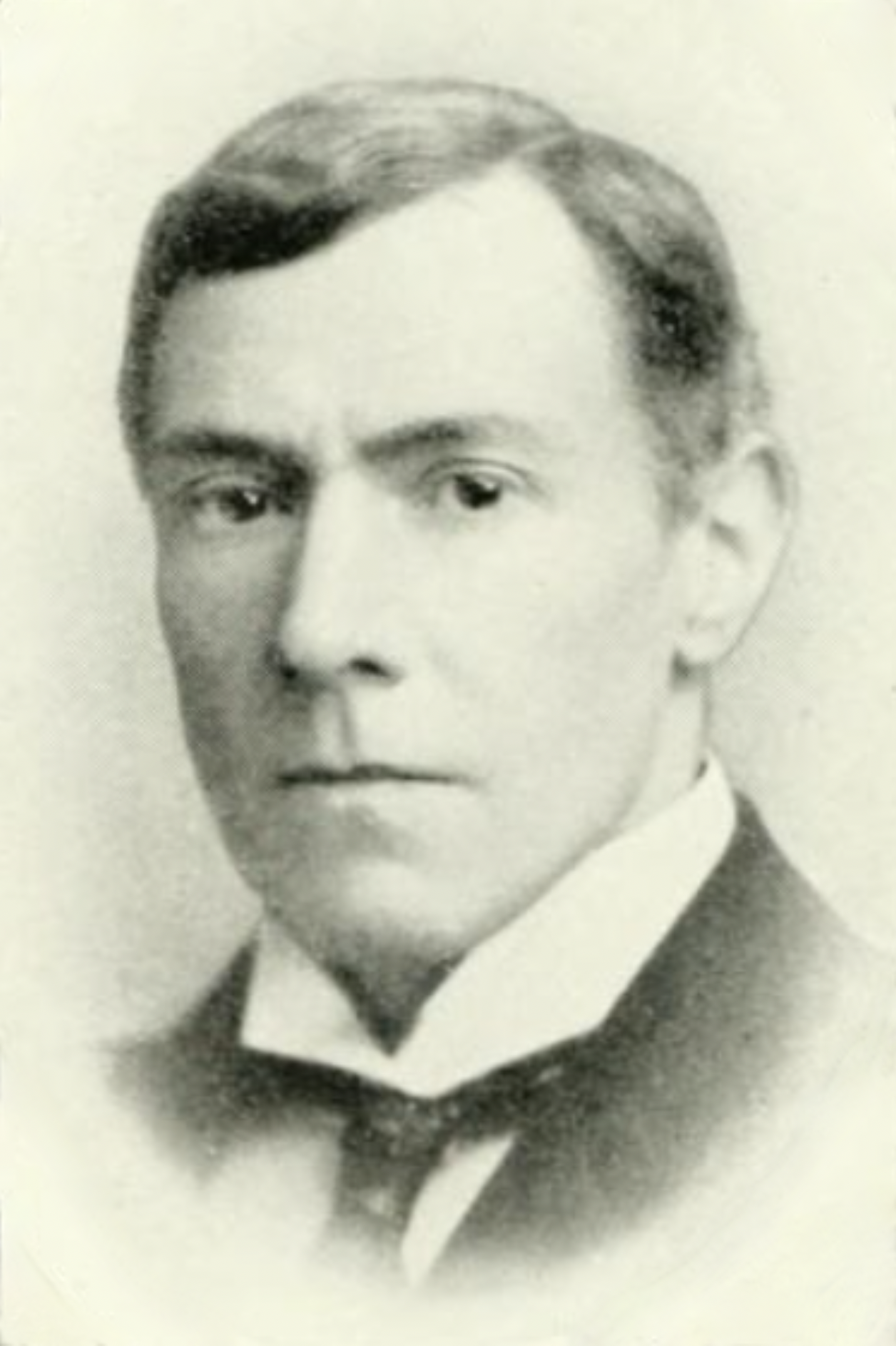
William Basil Worsfold, in 1914.

William Basil Worsfold (5 December 1858 – 26 September 1939) was a British writer and barrister who graduated from the University of Oxford. He wrote and published many books during the late 19th and early 20th-centuries on British colonial history, particularly South Africa.

== Early life ==
Worsfold was born in Yorkshire, England, as the second son of Reverend John Napper Worsfold. He was educated at St. Peter's, York, Wakefield School, and University College, Oxford (Bachelor of Arts 1883). He was called to the Bar, Middle Temple, in 1887. He married Jessie Symons, daughter of the late R.J.E. Symons, of Wadebridge, Cornwall, in 1898. From 1891 to 1900, he was a member of the Oxford Circuit, lecturing on Economics and Literature, for the Oxford Extension Delegates and London Joint Board.

== Career ==
Worsfold became chief editor of the Johannesburg Star newspaper in 1904 (the primary newspaper read by the English in South Africa), which provided him close contact with High Commissioner Lord Alfred Milner. He relinquished his job to Geoffrey Robinson, a member of Milner's Kindergarten, in April 1905, and returned to England. In 1909, Worsfold purchased a house in Kent (Romden Place, Smarden), not far from Sturry Court, Milner's residence. His most important book was Lord Milner's Work in South Africa, 1897-1902. In addition to his books, he contributed articles to the journals Quarterly, Nineteenth Century, Fortnightly, and the Cornhill. He was a member of the National and Cecil Clubs.

Worsfold died on September 26, 1939, at the age of 81.

== Publications ==
- The barren ground of northern Canada (1892)
- A Visit to Java with an account of the founding of Singapore, London: Bentley, 1893
- South Africa: A study in Colonial Administration and Development, London: Methune, 1895 (org.)
- The Principals of Criticism; an introduction of the study of literature (1897)
- "The Story of South Africa". London: Horace Marshall and Son. 1898.
- "The Redemption of Egypt". London: George Allen. 1899.
- Portuguese Nvassaland, London: Sampson, 1899
- The Valley of Light, studies with pen and pencil in the Vaudois Valley of Piedmont (1899)
- A History of South Africa (1900)
- On The Exercise of Judgment in Literature (1900)
- The problem of South African unity (1900)
- The Story of Egypt (1904)
- Browning's Men and Women (1904)
- Lord Milner's Work in South Africa, 1897-1902, New York: E.P. Dutton, 1906
- The Prelude (Chatto and Windus) (1907)
- The Reconstruction of the New Colonies Under Lord Milner, Vol. I, London: Kegan, 1913
- The Reconstruction of the New Colonies Under Lord Milner, Vol. II, London: Kegan, 1913
- The Union of South Africa, with chapters on Rhodesia and the Native Territories of the High Commission, London: Pitman, 1912
- The Future of Egypt, London: Collins, 1914
- The Empire on the Anvil, being suggestions and data for the future government of the British Empire, London: Smith, 1916
- The war and social reform; an endeavour to trace the influence of the war as a reforming agency; with special reference to matters primarily affecting the wage-earning classes (1919)
- Sir Bartle Frere, a footnote to the history of the British Empire, London: Thornton, 1923
- Palestine of the Mandate (1925)
- France in Tunis and Algeria (1930)

== Other ==
- Online Books by W. Basil Worsfold: Link
