= Geoffrey Dawson =

British newspaper editor (1874–1944)

- Born: George Geoffrey Robinson; 25 October 1874; Skipton-in-Craven, Yorkshire, England
- Died: 7 November 1944 (aged 70); London, England
- Education: Magdalen College, Oxford
- Occupations: Civil servant, editor

George Geoffrey Dawson (25 October 1874 – 7 November 1944) was editor of The Times from 1912 to 1919 and again from 1923 until 1941. His original last name was Robinson, but he changed it in 1917. He married Hon. Margaret Cecilia Lawley, daughter of Arthur Lawley, 6th Baron Wenlock, in 1919.

== Early life ==
Dawson was born 25 October 1874, in Skipton-in-Craven, Yorkshire, the eldest child of George Robinson, a banker, and his wife Mary (née Perfect). He attended Eton College and Magdalen College, Oxford. His academic career was distinguished; he took a First in Classical Moderations in 1895 and a First in Literae Humaniores ('Greats') in 1897. In 1898 he was elected a fellow of All Souls College, Oxford, a position he held for the rest of his life. He chose a career in civil service, entering in 1898 by open examination. After a year at the Post Office, he was transferred to the Colonial Office and in 1901 he was selected as assistant private secretary to Colonial Secretary Joseph Chamberlain. Later the same year Dawson obtained a similar position with Lord Milner, high commissioner in South Africa.

As Milner's assistant, Dawson participated in the establishment of British administration in South Africa in the aftermath of the Boer War. While there, he became a member of "Milner's kindergarten", a circle of young administrators and civil servants whose membership included Leo Amery, Bob Brand, Philip Kerr, Richard Feetham, John Buchan and Lionel Curtis. United by a common aspiration for Imperial Federation, all later became prominent in the "round table of Empire Loyalists".

== Career in journalism ==
Milner wanted to ensure the support of the local newspapers after his return to England. He persuaded the owners of the Johannesburg Star to appoint Dawson as the paper's editor. Dawson later parlayed this post into a position as the Johannesburg correspondent of The Times in February 1911 and then attracted the attention of Lord Northcliffe, owner of The Times, who appointed him editor of the paper in July 1912.

Dawson was unhappy, however, with the way that Northcliffe used the paper as an instrument to further his own personal political agenda and broke with him, stepping down as editor in February 1919. Dawson returned to the post in 1923 after Lord Northcliffe's death, when the paper's ownership had passed to John Jacob Astor V. Bob Brand had become the Astors' brother-in-law, and it is thought that he introduced Dawson to the Astors' circle at Cliveden, the so-called Cliveden set presided over by Nancy Astor.

In his second stint as editor, Dawson began to use the paper in the same manner as Lord Northcliffe had once done, to promote his own agenda. He also became a leader of a group of journalists that sought to influence national policy by private correspondence with leading statesmen. Dawson was close to both Stanley Baldwin and Neville Chamberlain. He was a prominent proponent and supporter of appeasement policies after Adolf Hitler came to power in Germany. He was a member of the Anglo-German Fellowship. Candid news dispatches from Berlin by Norman Ebbutt that warned of warmongering were rewritten in London to support the appeasement policy. Dawson explained to Lord Lothian on 23 May 1937: "I should like to get going with the Germans. I simply cannot understand why they should apparently be so much annoyed with The Times at this moment. I spend my nights in taking out anything which I think will hurt their susceptibilities and in dropping little things which are intended to soothe them".

In March 1939, however, The Times reversed course and called for war preparations. Dawson was a lifelong friend and dining companion of Edward Wood, later Lord Halifax, who was Foreign Secretary in the period 1938–1940. He promoted the policies of the Baldwin/Chamberlain governments of the period 1936–1940. Dawson retired in September 1941 and died on 7 November 1944 in London. He was succeeded as editor by Robert Barrington-Ward.

== Works ==
- "The Prospects of a United South Africa" . The Empire and the century. London: John Murray. 1905. pp. 521–538.

== Sources ==
- Fleming, N. C. "The Press, Empire and Historical Time: The Times and Indian self-government, c. 1911–47." Media History 16.2 (2010): 183–198.
- McDonough, Frank. "The Times, Norman Ebbut and the Nazis, 1927–37." Journal of Contemporary History 27#3 (1992): 407–424.
- Martel, Gordon, ed. The Times and Appeasement: The Journals of A L Kennedy, 1932–1939 (2000).
- The Office of the Times. The History of The Times: The 150th Anniversary and Beyond 1912–1948 (2 vol. 1952), passim.
- Riggs, Bruce Timothy. "Geoffrey Dawson, editor of "The Times" (London), and his contribution to the appeasement movement" (PhD dissertation, U of North Texas, 1993) online, bibliography pp 229–33.
- Wrench, John Evelyn (1955). Geoffrey Dawson and our times. Hutchinson.
- Marlowe, John. Milner, Apostle of Empire, London: Hamish Hamilton, 1976

Media offices
Preceded by George Earle Buckle	Editor of The Times; 1912–1919	Succeeded by Wickham Steed
Preceded by Wickham Steed	Editor of The Times; 1923–1941	Succeeded by Robert Barrington-Ward
