= Wickham Steed =

British journalist (1871–1956)

Henry Wickham Steed
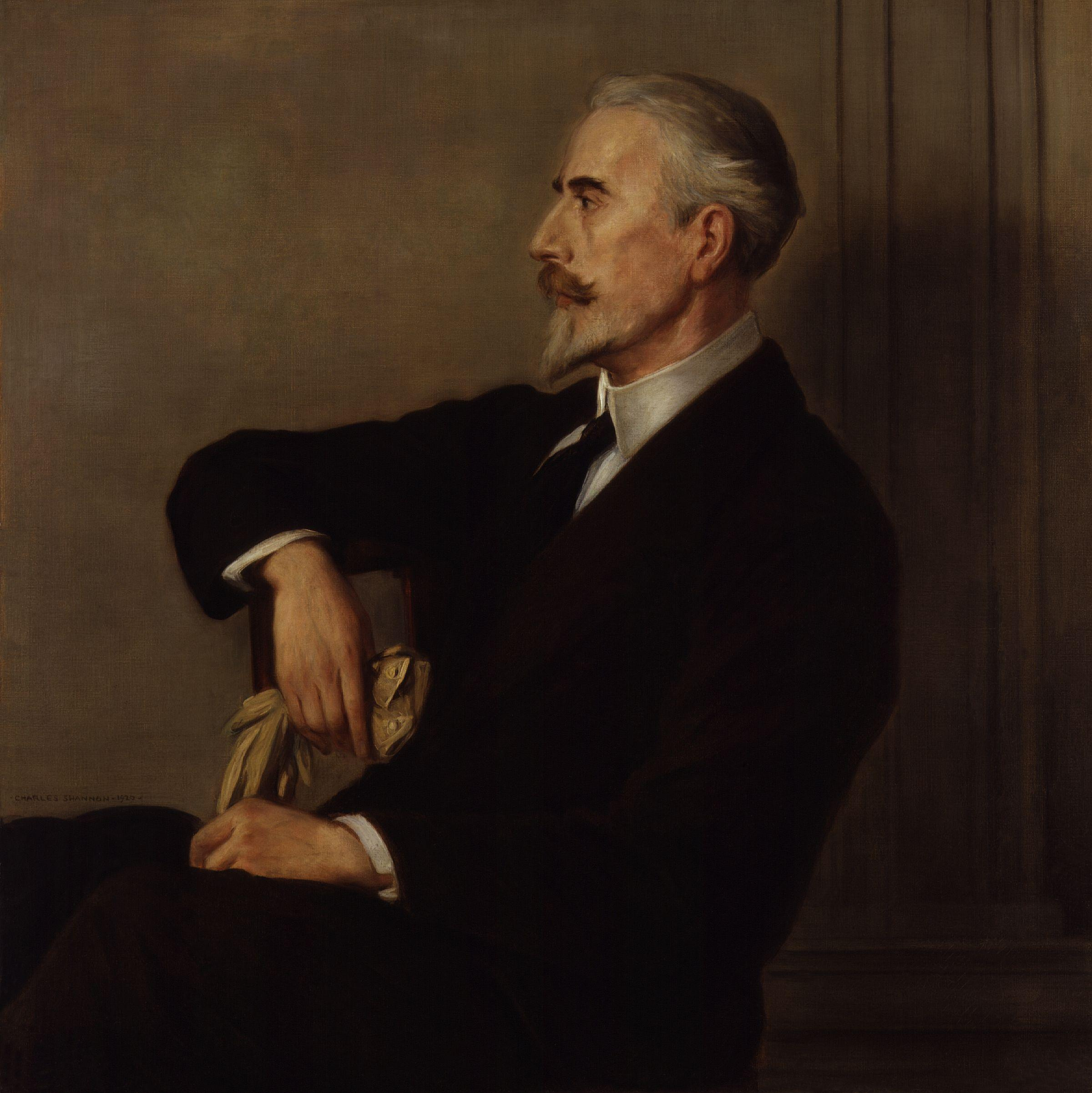
- Wickham Steed in 1920
- Born: Henry Wickham Steed; 10 October 1871; Long Melford, Suffolk, England
- Died: 13 January 1956 (aged 84); Wootton, England
- Occupations: Journalist, editor, and historian

Henry Wickham Steed (10 October 1871 – 13 January 1956) was an English journalist and historian. He was editor of The Times from 1919 to 1922.

== Early life ==
Born in Long Melford, England, Steed was educated at Sudbury Grammar School and the universities of Jena, Berlin and Paris. While in Europe, he demonstrated an early interest in social democracy and met with a range of left-wing figures, including Friedrich Engels, Wilhelm Liebknecht, August Bebel, and Alexandre Millerand. His encounters formed the basis of his first book, The Socialist and Labour Movement in England, Germany & France (1894).

== Foreign correspondent ==
Appointed by Joseph Pulitzer as Paris correspondent for the New York World, Steed joined The Times in 1896 as a foreign correspondent, working briefly out of Berlin before transferring successively to Rome (1897–1902) and then Vienna (1902–1913). In 1914, he moved to London to take over as foreign editor of The Times. During his time in Vienna he acquired a deep contempt for Austria-Hungary. An anti-Semite and a Germanophobe, in an editorial conference of The Times on 31 July 1914, Steed labelled efforts to stop the impending war as "a dirty German-Jewish international financial attempt to bully us into advocating neutrality". From 22 July 1914, Steed, in close agreement with The Times' proprietor, Lord Northcliffe, took a very bellicose line, and in editorials written on 29 and 31 July, Steed urged that the British Empire should enter the coming war.

Seen as a leading expert on Eastern Europe, Steed's views had much influence with decision-makers such as high-level bureaucrats and Cabinet politicians in the First World War and its aftermath. During the war, Steed befriended anti-Habsburg émigrés such as Edvard Beneš, Ante Trumbić, Tomáš Masaryk and Roman Dmowski and advised the British government to seek the liquidation of Austria-Hungary as a war aim. In particular, Steed was a very strong advocate of uniting all of the South Slavic peoples, such as the Croats, the Serbs and the Slovenes, into a federation, to be called Yugoslavia. The British Ambassador to Italy claimed in a diplomatic dispatch that Steed's fondness for the Yugoslav concept derived from a relationship that he maintained for a number of years "filially I believe rather maritally" with a Slavic woman from the Balkans. In October 1918, Steed met with Serbian Prime Minister Nikola Pašić to gain his support for the Yugoslav concept but was deeply angered when he learned that Pašić saw the new state as merely as extension of Greater Serbia and had no intention of sharing power with the Croats or the Slovenes. Steed charged Pašić with being a new "sultan" and severed his friendship with him.

== Editor of The Times ==
When the editor of The Times, Geoffrey Dawson, resigned from his post in February 1919, Steed was Northcliffe's first choice to succeed him. Steed had worked closely with Northcliffe during the war, becoming an adviser to him on foreign affairs. Steed was forced to contend with Northcliffe throughout most of his tenure as editor, as the press baron retained considerable control over the affairs of the newspaper.

After the war, Steed strongly disapproved of the Bolshevik regime in Russia. In an editorial written in another Northcliffe paper, the Daily Mail on 28 March 1919, Steed accused the British Prime Minister David Lloyd George, whom Steed detested, of betraying the White Russians because of a plot by "international Jewish financiers" and the Germans to help the Bolsheviks stay in power.

In 1920, Steed endorsed as genuine a notorious anti-Semitic forgery, The Protocols of the Learned Elders of Zion, writing in an editorial in The Times in which he blamed the Jews for World War I and the Bolshevik regime and called them the greatest threat to the British Empire. However, he retracted his view on the Protocols in 1921, when his paper's Constantinople correspondent proved them to be a forgery.

Steed was Northcliffe's personal choice for the editorship, but by 1922, the press baron was increasingly frustrated by Steed's failure to return The Times to profitability. After Northcliffe's death in August 1922, the new owners, John Jacob Astor and John Walter, dismissed Steed on 24 October and brought back Dawson as editor.

== Final years ==
In 1923, Steed became editor of Review of Reviews (1923–30), the journal established by William Thomas Stead in 1890. In the early 1930s, he was one of the first English speakers to express alarm about the new German dictatorial chancellor, Adolf Hitler. In 1934, he caused sensation with an article claiming to have evidence of secret German experiments in airborne biological warfare. The British government was sufficiently alarmed to start stockpiling vaccines although a retrospective analysis by the epidemiologist Martin Hugh-Jones has suggested that Steed's evidence could not have amounted to much. On the title page of his 1934 work, Hitler Whence and Whither?, Steed is described as a lecturer in Central European History at King's College London.

He died in Wootton, West Oxfordshire.

== In popular culture ==
Steed, played by actor Andrew Keir, appears in the 1974 miniseries Fall of Eagles, bringing a rumour of the impending Bosnian crisis to the attention of King Edward VII, Georges Clemenceau, and Alexander Izvolsky.

== Works ==
- The Habsburg Monarchy (1913)
- A Short History of Austria-Hungary and Poland (1914)
- Through Thirty Years, 1892-1922: A personal narrative (1924)
- Journalism (1928)
- The Real Stanley Baldwin (1930)
- The Antecedents of Post-war Europe (1932)
- A Way to Social Peace (1934)
- Hitler Whence and Whither? (1934)
- The Meaning of Hitlerism (1934)
- Vital Peace: A study of risks (1936)
- The Doom of the Habsburgs (1937)
- The Press (1938)
- Our War Aims (1939)

== See also ==
- Robert William Seton-Watson

Media offices
Preceded by Geoffrey Dawson	Editor of The Times; 1919–1922	Succeeded by Geoffrey Dawson
