= Peter Perry (colonialist) =

British colonial employee

- Born: 1873
- Died: 1935 (aged 61–62)
- Citizenship: United Kingdom
- Occupation: Colonial employee

J. Frederick "Peter" Perry (1873-1935) was a British colonial employee best known for his work as a member of Milner's Kindergarten in South Africa, immediately after the end of the Second Boer War.

== Biography ==
An Oxford Graduate, and employed by Colonial Secretary Joseph Chamberlain, Perry was placed on the staff of Lord Alfred Milner in 1900 as his personal secretary, in wake of the British victory in the Boer War. In July 1901, Perry became Assistant Imperial Secretary with responsibility over all native (indigenous) territories in South Africa, including the newly acquired areas of the Orange River Colony and Transvaal. To bring South Africa back on its feet in the wake of war, he negotiated with the Portuguese in Mozambique to acquire native (African) labour for the mines. In April 1903, he resigned to join private industry, becoming chairman of the Rand Native Labour Association, to head up recruitment and working conditions of African labour in the gold mines on the Rand (greater Johannesburg). After the Transvaal passed an ordinance permitting temporary foreign workers on February 10, 1904, Peter Perry travelled to China to advertise and recruit Chinese laborers, to be hired on three year contracts, to work in the South African gold mines. To this, he was very successful. The first 1,000 laborers arrived in the mines in June, growing to 40,000 a year later, and peaking at 50,000 in 1906. Although the workers were unskilled, it was from this help that South Africa's economy recovered quickly. The last of the Chinese workers left South Africa in 1910.

In 1912 Peter Perry left South Africa for Canada, and along with fellow Kindergartener Robert Brand, took up an Investment Banking career at the London-based financial firm of Lazard Brothers, where he stayed until retirement.
