= Rue Nitot =

The Rue Nitot meeting was an event in the First World War, when the British Empire delegates at the Peace Conference in Versailles got together to register the harsh terms of the Treaty of Versailles, and tried to soften the conditions for peace with Germany. The meeting was held at Prime Minister David Lloyd George's flat, 23 Rue Nitot, in Paris, on June 1, 1919.

== Background ==
When Germany asked for peace in the early fall of 1918, it asked for peace terms based on President Woodrow Wilson's Fourteen Points. However, the Fourteen Points, made public on January 8, 1918, were constructed without input from the Allies, and issued without their knowledge. This particularly irked the British, who objected to a "Freedom of the Seas" passage, as they maintained a full land and sea blockade on Germany, which violated Wilson's second point. The Fourteen Points were used as the basis, or starting point, of peace negotiations, although the Germans were told by Wilson, on November 5, and later by Marshal Ferdinand Foch at the signing of the November 11th armistice, that financial reparations were also in order.

As one of the harsh conditions meted out by the French, the Germans were not allowed to participate on the peace negotiations. This surprised the American and English peace plan delegates, who believed in a "New World", or "Wilsonian" peace, and not an "Old World" European peace. However, Prime Minister Clemenceau made it known that the Germans were the aggressors and criminals in this war, and "What kind of justice would be served if the vanquished were allowed to sit at the table, on an equal footing with the victors?" In the end, a team of German delegates were allowed to receive a draft of the treaty, and they were given two weeks (extended to three) to suggest changes to it. Those suggestions were made at the end of May 1919, and the purpose of the Rue Nitot meeting was to discuss those changes.

== The Meeting ==
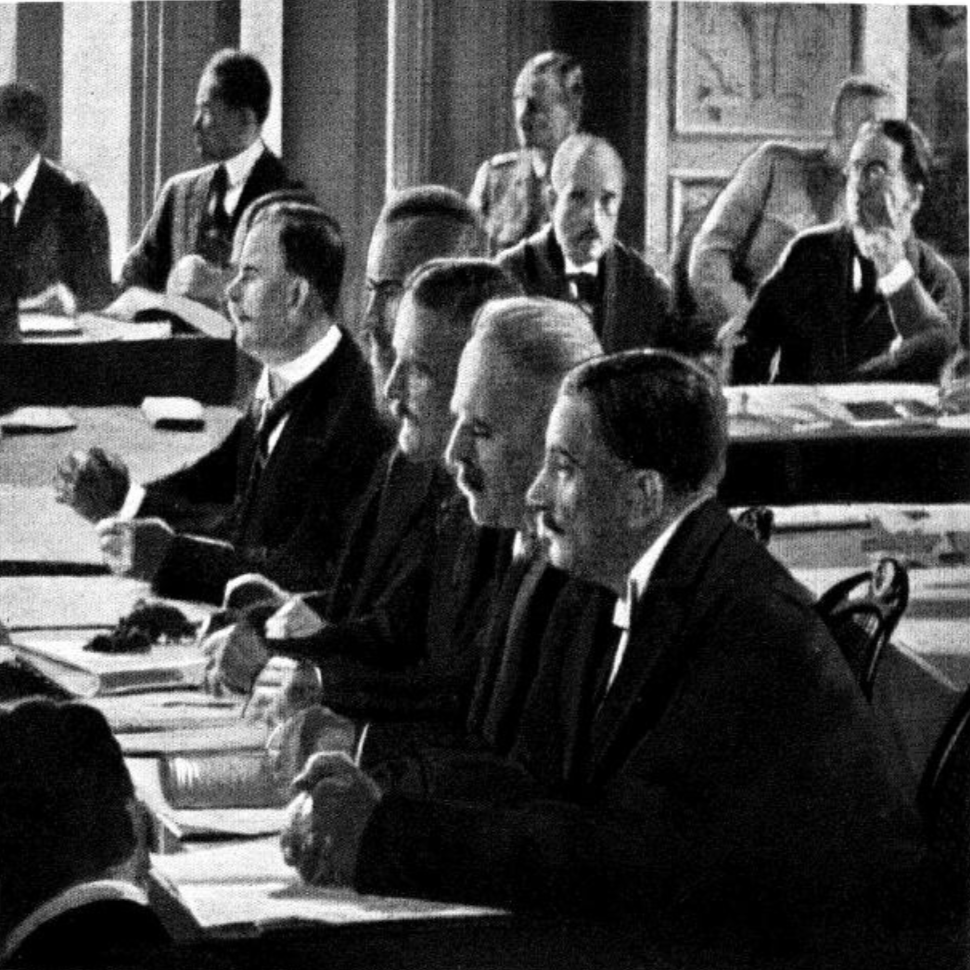
German Delegates Receiving the Draft Treaty, May 7, 1919

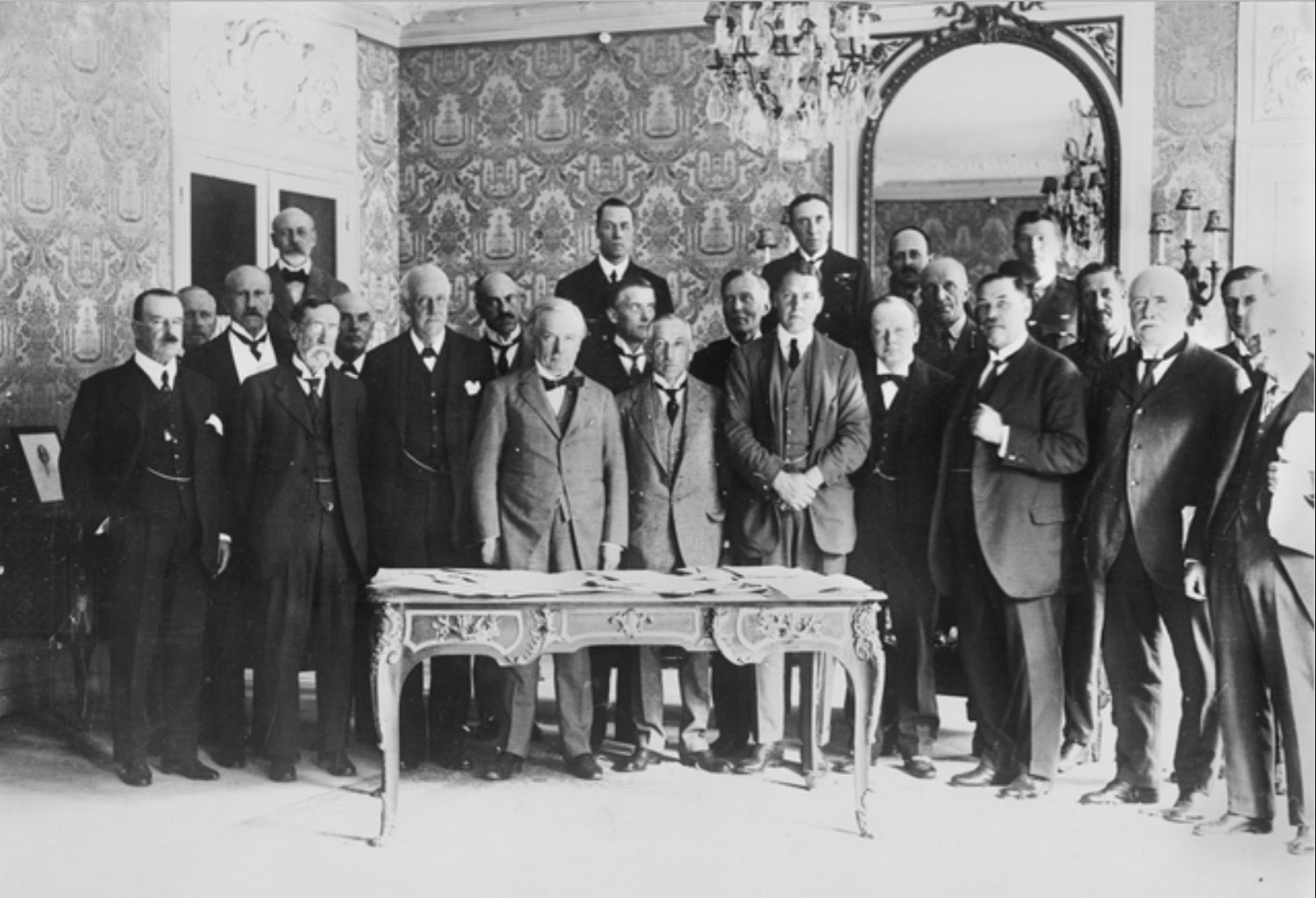
The British Empire Objects to the Treaty of Versailles, June 1, 1919

One of the British objections to the peace treaty was the French demand for a permanent land barrier to exist between France and Germany. The barrier, to be "a neutral zone" twenty miles wide and patrolled by the Allied nations, was meant to prevent a future German invasion of France. The matter was dropped when Prime Minister Lloyd George and President Wilson promised France a joint military guarantee on March 14, 1919. However, it was raised again in April, with the French requesting a 15 year occupation. Eventually, the matter was decided in France's favor, with permanent neutrality for the Rhineland established in 1925 (see external link: Locarno).

Two other conditions from France included excluding Germany from the League of Nations, and denying it a most favored nation trading status.

However, probably the most difficult issue was reparations. The French wanted the Germans to pay for the damage caused to France and Belgium during World War I, and for this a team of accountants were brought to Versailles to fix a price on the war. Every death carried a price, as did every wounded, every animal killed, and all material devastation was tallied. What the Germans couldn't pay from its treasury would be exacted by appropriating raw materials by the trainload, specifically coal, chemicals and dyestuffs. In all, the tally came to $13.75 Billion ($233 Billion in 2023 dollars). When Germany eventually defaulted on its payments in late 1922, there were rumors that two trainloads of German toys were shipped to France during Christmastime.

When the Secretary of State for War, Winston Churchill, said, "The hatred of France for Germany was something more than human", South African Prime Minister Louis Botha reminded everyone that on this day, seventeen years ago, the English, represented by Lord Milner, got together with the Boers to sign a peace treaty that ended the Boer War. "On that occasion it was moderation which had saved South Africa for the British Empire, and he hoped on this occasion that it would be moderation which would save the world."

The empire delegates unanimously authorized Lloyd George to go back to the Big Four and ask for modifications to the peace terms. The areas of disagreement were on reparations, the Rhineland occupation, Germany's membership in the League of Nations, its frontiers with Poland, and scores of other smaller but irritating “pin prick” matters, like the renaming of rivers.

When Lloyd George met with Georges Clemenceau, he informed him that if these matters can't be resolved, and if Germany fails to sign the peace treaty (which appeared likely), that the British Empire would no longer enforce its naval blockade on Germany (which deprived civilians of food), and that the British Army would not take part in an occupation of Germany.

== Consequences ==
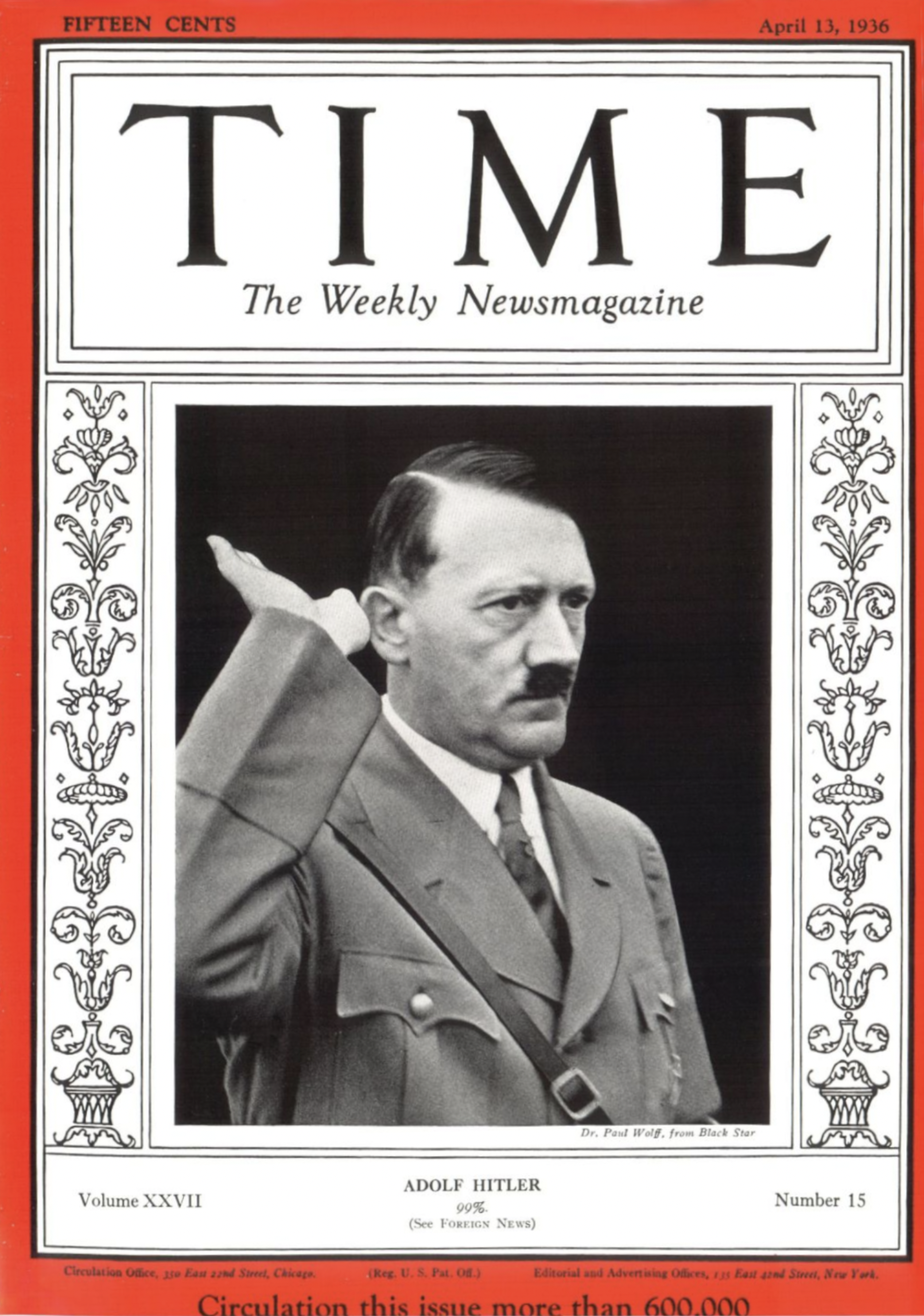
Adolf Hitler, Time Magazine cover, April 13, 1936

When the Council of Four met on June 2 and were given the British ultimatum, they were upset. The treaty had been largely written by them (President Wilson played a lead role in the construction of its framework back in January), they were tired, and they did not want to redo the work. In his memoirs, Lloyd George said he wasn't asking for large concessions, only those that brought the treaty in line with Wilson's Fourteen Points. Afterwards, all President Wilson could say was, "Reparations weren't specifically excluded from the Fourteen Points, so they were allowed."

When the Germans received the draft treaty on May 7, they were shocked to learn that they were expected to accept it without the opportunity to negotiate. On June 16, after weeks of attempts at negotiation, the Allies presented the final version of their conditions for peace, which were virtually unchanged from the first draft. Germany was given seven days to accept the treaty or face renewed hostilities. After Minister President Philipp Scheidemann resigned in protest, two delegates were sent to Paris, and the treaty was signed at 3 pm on June 28, 1919. Lloyd George, not knowing if they would appear, made them sign first, before the other 66 plenipotentiaries.

One of the twenty-five points laid out by the German Workers' Party (DAP) in early 1920 was to refute the Treaty of Versailles. During his rise in politics in the 1920s, Adolf Hitler always referred to the Treaty of Versailles as "the Versailles diktat" (see external link, same). After the hardliners in France, Georges Clemenceau and Ferdinand Foch, died in 1929, a younger generation of politicians rose in France who agreed with the English that the terms of Versailles were too tough, and a series of concessions occurred with the Locarno Treaties, resulting in Germany entering the League of Nations, being granted a most favored nation trading status, and allowing its border with Poland to be open to negotiation. Also, reparations were partially forgiven in 1924, with the Dawes Plan, and again in 1929 with the Young Plan. Concessions in the latter half of the 1920's became known as "The Spirit of Locarno". However, with the ascendancy of Adolf Hitler to power as Chancellor in 1933, and President (Führer) in 1934, concessions became appeasement with his territorial demands. When Hitler reoccupied the Rhineland with soldiers on March 7, 1936, in defiance of Locarno, the Allies, remembering the horrors and bloodshed of World War I, were paralyzed. Until the invasion of Czechoslovakia on March 15, 1939, conservatives in England hoped that Hitler, a rising star in the media, was just playing into nationalistic fever, and that all was well.

== See also ==
- World War I reparations: Link
- Armistice Terms, pgs. 170-172: Link
- Australia's Position: Link
- Birth of the Nazi Party, pg. 50: Link
- Adolph Hitler Violates the Treaty of Versailles: Link
- "The Spirit of Locarno": Link
- Herbert Hoover meets Adolph Hitler: Link
