= Alfred Milner, 1st Viscount Milner =

British statesman and colonial administrator (1854–1925)

The Right Honourable The Viscount Milner KG, GCB, GCMG, PC
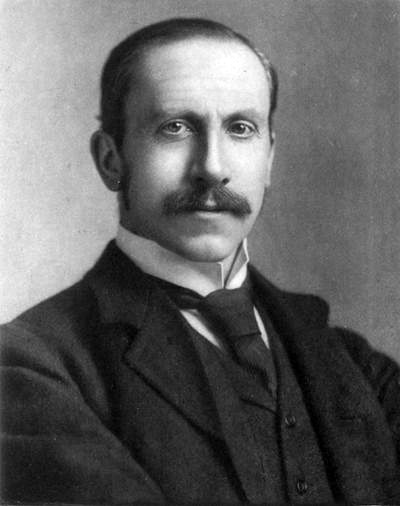
- Milner c. 1906

Secretary of State for the Colonies
- In office 10 January 1919 – 13 February 1921
- Preceded by: Walter Long
- Succeeded by: Winston Churchill

Secretary of State for War
- In office 18 April 1918 – 10 January 1919
- Monarch: George V
- Prime Minister: David Lloyd George
- Preceded by: Edward Stanley, 17th Earl of Derby
- Succeeded by: Winston Churchill

1st Governor of the Transvaal and Orange River Colony
- In office 23 June 1902 – 1 April 1905
- Monarch: Edward VII
- Preceded by: Himself as Administrator of the Transvaal and Orange River Colony
- Succeeded by: William Palmer, 2nd Earl of Selborne

Administrator of the Transvaal and the Orange River Colony
- In office 4 January 1901 – 23 June 1902
- Monarchs: Queen Victoria; Edward VII
- Lieutenant: Hamilton John Goold-Adams
- Preceded by: Office established Christiaan de Wet; As State President of the Orange Free State (31 May 1902); Schalk Willem Burger; As President of the South African Republic (31 May 1902)
- Succeeded by: Himself; As Governor of the Transvaal and Orange River Colony

Governor of the Cape Colony and High Commissioner for Southern Africa
- In office 5 May 1897 – 6 March 1901
- Monarchs: Queen Victoria; Edward VII
- Prime Minister: John Gordon Sprigg; William Schreiner; John Gordon Sprigg
- Preceded by: Sir William Howley Goodenough
- Succeeded by: Sir Walter Francis Hely-Hutchinson

Personal details
- Born: Alfred Milner; 23 March 1854 Gießen, Upper Hesse, Grand Duchy of Hesse
- Died: 13 May 1925 (aged 71) Great Wigsell, East Sussex, England
- Resting place: Saint Mary the Virgin Church, Salehurst, East Sussex, England
- Spouse: Violet Milner
- Education: University of Tübingen; King's College School; Balliol College, Oxford
- Occupation: Colonial administrator, statesman
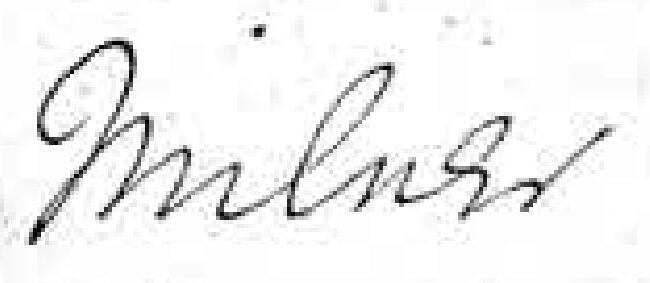
- Signature

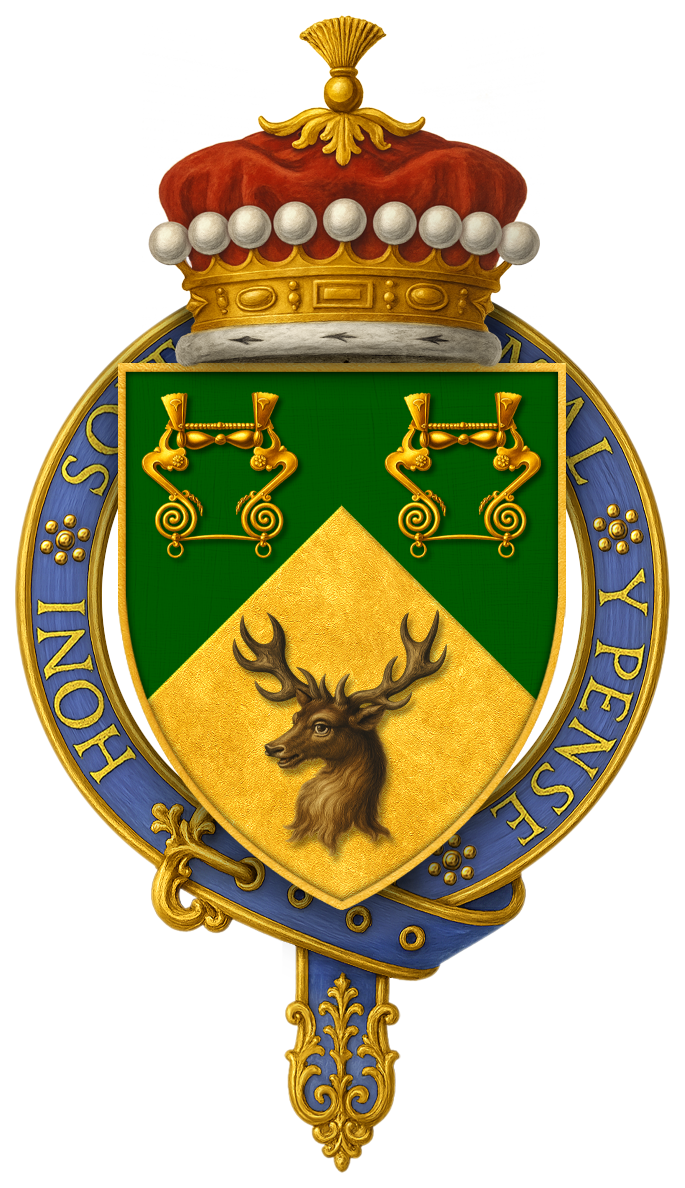
Garter-encircled shield of arms of Alfred Milner, 1st Viscount Milner, KG, GCB, GCMG, PC

Alfred Milner, 1st Viscount Milner, KG, GCB, GCMG, PC (23 March 1854 – 13 May 1925) was a British statesman and colonial administrator who played a very important role in the formulation of British foreign and domestic policy between the mid-1890s and the early 1920s. From December 1916 to November 1918, he was one of the most important members of Prime Minister David Lloyd George's War cabinet.

Milner was born in the Grand Duchy of Hesse in 1854, and was educated in Germany and England before attending Balliol College, Oxford, where he graduated with a first class in classics. Though he was called to the bar in 1881, Milner instead became a journalist before entering politics as a Liberal, before leaving the party in 1886 over his opposition to Irish Home Rule. He joined the staff of the Chancellor of the Exchequer George Goschen and was posted to Egypt as under-secretary of finance. He briefly chaired the Board of Inland Revenue until April 1897, when he was appointed Governor of the Cape Colony and High Commissioner for Southern Africa by Joseph Chamberlain following the disastrous Jameson Raid.

As Governor and High Commissioner, Milner was a leading advocate for British subjects of the Transvaal and Orange Free State, and his policy precipitated the Second Boer War. During the war, Milner received praise and criticism for his civilian administration in South Africa, including the establishment of concentration camps to intern the Boers. Following the British victory and annexation of the Boer republics, Milner was named the first British governor. Upon his return to England in 1905, he faced censure for the use of corporal punishment against Chinese labourers. He remained a firm advocate for British imperialism for the remainder of his life. Through his influence on young civil servants and imperialists, including Lionel Curtis and Leo Amery, Milner's influence on the British Empire extended through the Second World War.

During the First World War, Milner served as a key advisor and cabinet member to Prime Minister David Lloyd George. During the March 1918 collapse of the Western Front, Milner coordinated the consolidation of Allied forces under the commander of Ferdinand Foch, whom he personally selected as Supreme Allied Commander. Foch won the Battle of Amiens, repelling the German advance and turning the tide of the war. Milner was appointed Secretary of State for War for the duration of the conflict, which resulted in an Allied victory and armistice in November 1918. At the subsequent Paris Peace Conference, Milner was a leading delegate and a signatory to the Treaty of Versailles. He served as Secretary of State for the Colonies for the remainder of his public career.

== Early life and education ==
Alfred Milner was born on 23 March 1854 in Giessen, Upper Hesse, Grand Duchy of Hesse. His father was Charles Milner, a London physician with a German mother and English father who was a reader in English at the University of Tübingen. His maternal grandfather, John Ready, was Lieutenant Governor of Prince Edward Island and the Isle of Man.

Alfred Milner was educated first at Tübingen, then at King's College School and from 1872 to 1876 as a scholar of Balliol College, Oxford, studying under the classicist theologian Benjamin Jowett. Having won the Hertford, Craven, Eldon and Derby scholarships, he graduated in 1877 with a first class in classics and was elected to a fellowship at New College, leaving, however, for London in 1879. At Oxford he formed a close friendship with the young economic historian Arnold Toynbee. He wrote a paper in support of Toynbee's theories of social work and, in 1895, twelve years after Toynbee's death at the age of 30, a tribute titled Arnold Toynbee: a Reminiscence.

== Early career ==
Although authorised to practise law after being called to the bar at the Inner Temple in 1881, he joined the staff of the Pall Mall Gazette under John Morley, becoming assistant editor to Morley's successor William Thomas Stead. In 1885, Milner abandoned journalism for a brief political career, standing as the Liberal candidate for the Harrow division of Middlesex but lost in the general election.

In 1886, Milner supported the breakaway Liberal Unionist Party over his opposition to Irish Home Rule. He became private secretary to Liberal Unionist George Goschen and rose in rank when Goschen became Chancellor of the Exchequer in 1887. Two years later, Goschen used his influence to have Milner appointed under-secretary of finance in Egypt. Milner remained in Egypt from 1889 to 1892, his period of office coinciding with the first great reforms under Evelyn Baring, 1st Earl of Cromer, after the danger of bankruptcy which precipitated British control had been avoided.

Returning to England in 1892, he published England and Egypt which, at once, became the authoritative account of the work done since British occupation began in 1882. Later that year, he received an appointment as chairman of the Board of Inland Revenue where he remained until 1897. While at Inland Revenue, he established relationships with Michael Hicks-Beach, 1st Earl St Aldwyn and Sir William Vernon Harcourt.

In 1894, he was made CB and in 1895, KCB. Milner remained at the Board of Inland Revenue until 1897, having established a reputation as one of the clearest-headed and most judicious British civil servants, a position as a man of moderate Liberal Unionist views, and strong political allies in Goschen, Cromer, St Aldwyn and Harcourt.

== South Africa ==
=== Relations with the Boer republics ===
The South African Republic, more commonly referred to by the British as the Transvaal, was established in 1852 by Afrikaner farmers who had emigrated from the Cape Colony in the Great Trek to live beyond the reach of British colonial administration. These farmers, known as Boers, successfully defended their independence from the British Empire in the First Boer War from 1880 to 1881, which established self-government under nominal British suzerainty in the Pretoria Convention. Following the discovery of gold in the Transvaal in 1884, thousands of fortune seekers flocked there from Europe, but mostly from Britain. This new influx of foreigners, whom the Boers called Uitlanders, was received negatively in the republic, and they were refused the right to vote.

In 1896, British colonial administrator Leander Starr Jameson, under the employment of Cecil Rhodes, attempted and failed to trigger an uprising against President Kruger by the Uitlanders. The raid dramatically worsened relations between the British Cape Colony and the Boer republics, and the latter began increasing their importation of guns and ammunition from Germany. By April 1897, Lord Rosmead resigned as High Commissioner for Southern Africa and Governor of Cape Colony. Secretary of State for the Colonies Joseph Chamberlain sought to replace Rosmead with a statesman who could restore public confidence and uphold British interests in dealing with the Transvaal and Orange Free State governments, and he chose Milner at the suggestion of William Palmer, 2nd Earl of Selborne. The selection was cordially approved by the Liberal Party and warmly recognised at a farewell dinner on 28 March 1897, presided over by H. H. Asquith.

Reaching the Cape Colony in May, Milner resolved difficulties with President Kruger over the treatment of the Uitlanders under the Transvaal Aliens' Law, then set out on a tour of British South Africa. Between August 1897 and May 1898 he travelled Cape Colony, the Bechuanaland Protectorate, Rhodesia, and Basutoland. To better understand the point of view of the Cape Dutch and the burghers of the Transvaal and Orange Free State, Milner learned both Dutch and Afrikaans. He came to the conclusion that there could be no peace or progress while there remained the "permanent subjection of British to Dutch in [the Transvaal]". The Transvaal also obstructed British ambitions for a "Cape to Cairo" railway and trading network, and Milner realised that with the discovery of gold in the Transvaal, the balance of power in South Africa had shifted in favor of the Boers. He feared a newly wealthy Transvaal would unite with Cape Afrikaners and jeopardise the entire British position in the region.

In a history of the Second Boer War in 1909, Milner later wrote:

"The Dutch can never form a perfect allegiance merely to Great Britain. The British can never, without moral injury, accept allegiance to any body politic which excludes their motherland. But British and Dutch alike could, without moral injury, without any sacrifice to their several traditions, unite in loyal devotion to an empire-state, in which Great Britain and South Africa would be partners, and could work cordially together for the good of South Africa as a member of that great whole. And so you see the true Imperialist is also the best South African."

Milner became the most prominent voice in the British government advocating war with the Boer republics to secure British control over the region. After meeting Milner for the first time, Boer soldier (and future politician) Jan Smuts predicted that he would become "more dangerous than Rhodes" and "a second Bartle Frere".

=== Second Boer War ===
==== Pre-war diplomacy ====
After the February 1898 Transvaal election, which Kruger won by a landslide, Milner concluded that the Pretoria government would never redress the grievances of the Uitlanders on its own initiative. This gave Milner the pretext to use the question to his advantage. In a speech delivered on 3 March 1898 at Graaff Reinet, an Afrikaner Bond stronghold in the British Cape Colony, Milner outlined his determination to secure freedom and equality for British subjects in the Transvaal, and he urged the Boers to induce the Pretoria government to assimilate its institutions to those of the free communities of South Africa. His pronouncement, along with the resumption of control of the Progressive Party by Cecil Rhodes, greatly alarmed the Afrikaners. At the March 1898 elections, opponents of the Progressives won a majority in the House of Assembly and William Schreiner formed a government opposed to British intervention in the Transvaal.

Convinced his position in the Cape Colony had become untenable, Milner returned to England in November 1898, where he secured Chamberlain's support to back the Uitlanders before returning to Cape Colony in February 1899. In the ten weeks Milner spent away from the Colony, relations with the Boers had deteriorated after acting High Commissioner William Francis Butler had allowed the inference that he did not support Uitlander grievances. On 4 May, Milner penned a memorable dispatch to the Colonial Office arguing for intervention to ensure Uitlander enfranchisement, which he posited was the only means of stabilizing the situation in South Africa and ensuring the predominant position of British interests in the region. He notably did not base his argument on the Pretoria Convention and argued "suzerainty" was an "etymological question". Instead, he stated that the condition of thousands of British subjects in the Transvaal as "helots" was undermining the prestige of Britain throughout South Africa, and he called for "some striking proof" of the intention of the British government to preserve its position. This dispatch was telegraphed to London for immediate publication; but it was kept private for a time by the home government. At the insistence of Jan Hendrik Hofmeyr, a peace conference was held at Bloemfontein between Milner and Kruger from 31 May to 5 June. Kruger rejected Milner's three demands: for Uitlander enfranchisement, for the use of English in the Transvaal parliament, and for the right of the British Parliament to review all Transvaal laws.

==== Administration during the war ====
When the Second Boer War broke out in October 1899, Milner supported and advised the British military efforts in South Africa. In the words of Lord Roberts, his "courage never faltered" during this early phase of the war. Milner set out to influence British education in the area for the English-speaking populations in order to Anglicise the Transvaal. Through the foundation of the Transvaal Education Department he founded a series of schools known as the "Milner Schools", including modern-day Pretoria High School for Girls, Pretoria Boys High School, Jeppe High School for Boys, King Edward VII School (Johannesburg), Potchefstroom High School for Boys and Hamilton Primary School.

In February 1901, though the war was still in progress, Milner was called upon to undertake the administration of the two Boer states, both now annexed to the British Empire. He thereupon resigned the governorship of Cape Colony but retained the post of high commissioner. During this period, his government established numerous concentration camps to intern the Boer civilian population. Milner's efforts to reconstruct the civil administration were limited while operations continued in the field, and he therefore returned to England to spend a "hard-begged holiday," mainly occupied in work at the Colonial Office. On his arrival to London on 24 May 1901, had an audience with Edward VII, received the GCB and was made a privy councillor. He was raised to the peerage as Baron Milner of St James's in the County of London and of Cape Town in the Colony of the Cape of Good Hope. Speaking the next day at a luncheon in his honour, he asserted that the war had been unavoidable, as the British were asked to "conciliate" was "panoplied hatred, insensate ambition, invincible ignorance". In late July, Milner received the Honorary Freedom of the City of London and gave another speech in which he defended the government policy.

Despite these honours, opposition to Milner within the Liberal Party grew over both his failed diplomacy before the war and his conduct during the war. Leonard Courtney characterised his as a "lost mind", and Liberal leader Henry Campbell-Bannerman was among those to agitate for his recall. However, these efforts failed, and he returned to South Africa in August 1901.

On his return, he plunged into the herculean task of remodelling the administration. As the chief civilian administrator in South Africa, he bitterly fought Lord Kitchener, the Commander-in-Chief in South Africa, who ultimately won out. However, Milner ultimately drafted the terms of the Boer surrender, signed in Pretoria on 31 May 1902. The war concluded with the complete surrender of the Boers, though Milner's efforts for punitive terms imposed on the Boers were tempered by Lord Kitchener. In recognition of his services he was, on 15 July 1902, elevated to the title of viscount.

=== Post-war administration ===
On 21 June, immediately following the formal end of hostilities, Milner published the letters patent establishing Crown colony governments in the Transvaal Colony and Orange River Colony and changing his title of administrator to that of governor. He established a 10% tax on the annual net produce of the gold mines and devoted his attention to the repatriation of the Boers, land resettlement by British colonists, education, justice, the constabulary, and the development of railways.

After Joseph Chamberlain's surprise resignation on 18 September 1903 due to ill health, Milner declined the vacant post of Secretary of State for the Colonies, considering it more important to complete his work in South Africa, where economic depression was becoming pronounced. Milner's two-stage economic plan, which he called "Lift and Overspill", called for increases in government revenue through economic prosperity and government spending to spread prosperity. Mining labour was essential to this plan, and in December, Parliament passed a Labour Ordinance to import Chinese labourers to avert a shortage.

Winston Churchill, in the House of Commons on 22 February 1906, said of the Chinese labour ordinance,

....it cannot in the opinion of His Majesty's Government be classified as slavery in the extreme acceptance of the word without some risk of terminological inexactitude.

In the latter part of 1904 and the early months of 1905, Milner elaborated a plan to provide the Transvaal with a system of representative government, between Crown colony administration and self-government. Letters patent providing for this representative government were issued on 31 March 1905.

Speaking in Johannesburg on the eve of his retirement and departure, he recommended promotion of the material prosperity of the country and the equality of Afrikaners and the British. Referring to the war, he added, "What I should prefer to be remembered by is a tremendous effort subsequent to the war not only to repair the ravages of that calamity but to re-start the colonies on a higher plane of civilization than they have ever previously attained". He concluded with a reference to the subject of imperial unity. "When we who call ourselves Imperialists talk of the British Empire," Milner said, "we think of a group of states bound, not in an alliance or alliances that can be made and unmade, but in a permanent organic union. Of such a union, the dominions of the sovereign as they exist today are only the raw material."

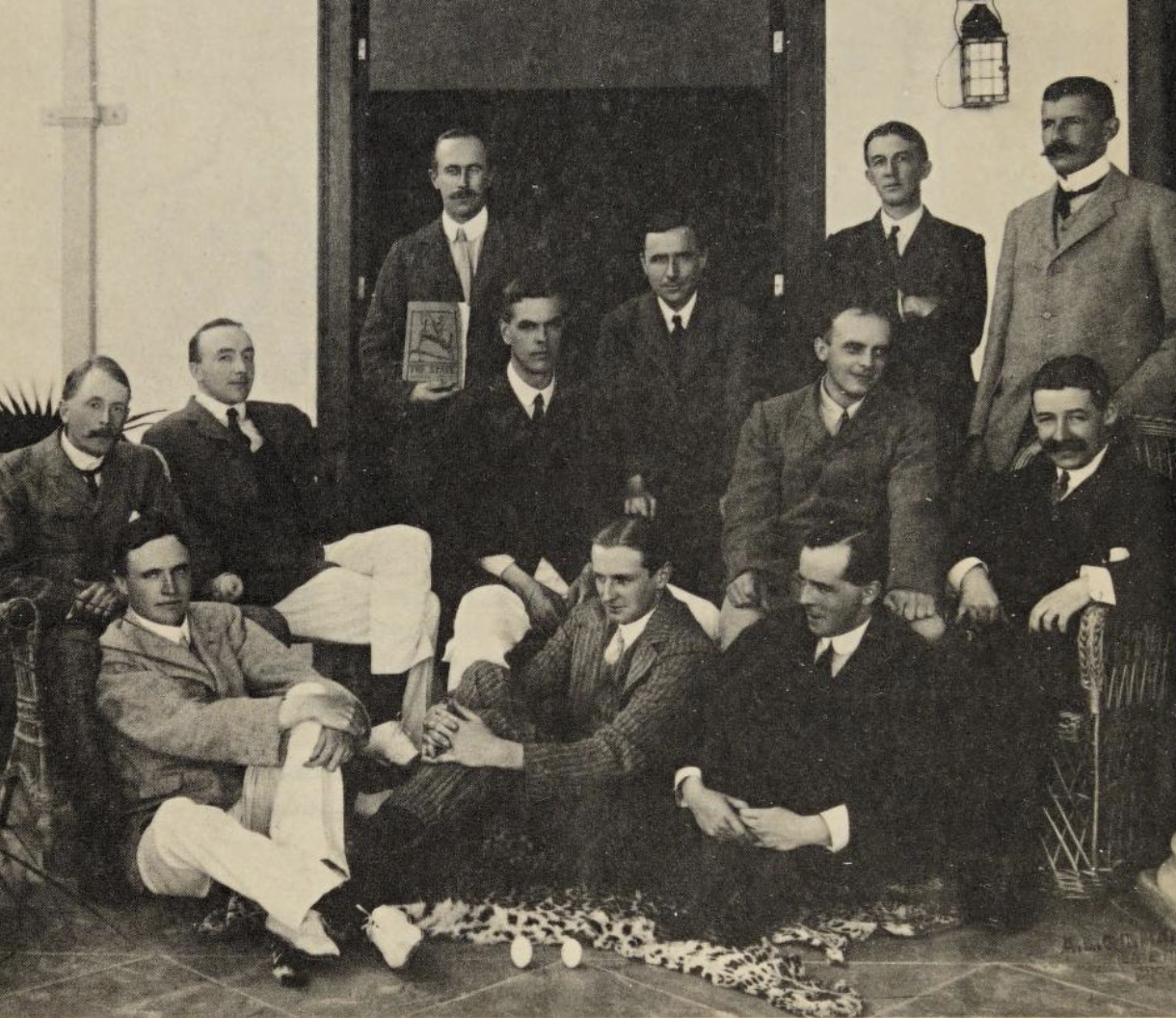
Milner's Kindergarten, pictured in 1902: Brand (standing, from left), Duncan, Baker, Hitchens, Wyndham (seated), Feetham, Curtis, Perry, Dougal Malcolm, John Dove (seated on floor), Kerr, and Dawson.

==== Milner's Kindergarten ====
In the aftermath of the war, at Milner's suggestion, the British government sent Henry Birchenough, a businessman and old friend of Milner's, as special trade commissioner to South Africa with the task of preparing a Blue Book on trade prospects. To aid him in his task, Milner recruited a team of gifted young lawyers and administrators, most of them Oxford graduates, who became known as "Milner's Kindergarten". Among his proteges were Peter Perry, Lionel Curtis, Patrick Duncan, Geoffrey Dawson and Hugh Wyndham, many of whom continued in South Africa under Lord Selborne after Milner's retirement and return to England. The Kindergarten retained a major influence in British South African and imperial affairs through the Second World War, long after Milner's death.

== Return to England ==
By April 1905, Milner had been suffering health difficulties from the incessant strain of work and determined a need to retire, leaving Pretoria on 2 April and sailing for Europe the following day. He left South Africa during an acute economic crisis and under widespread criticism but was praised by colonial secretary Alfred Lyttelton for laying deep and strong the foundation upon which a united South Africa. Upon returning home, Oxford bestowed upon him the honorary degree of DCL.

=== Censure motion (1906) ===
On 20 March 1906, a motion was moved by William Byles, a radical Liberal member of the House of Commons, censuring Milner for his infraction of the Chinese labour ordinance by not forbidding light corporal punishment. On behalf of the Liberal government, an amendment was moved by Winston Churchill, stating, "This House, while recording its condemnation of the flogging of Chinese coolies in breach of the law, desires, in the interests of peace and conciliation in South Africa, to refrain from passing censure upon individuals". Churchill further argued,

"Lord Milner has gone from South Africa, probably forever. The public service knows him no more. Having exercised great authority he now exercises no authority. Having held high employment he now has no employment. Having disposed of events which have shaped the course of history, he is now unable to deflect in the smallest degree the policy of the day. Having been for many years, or at least for many months, the arbiter of the fortunes of men who are 'rich beyond the dreams of avarice', he is today poor, and honourably poor. After twenty years of exhausting service under the Crown he is today a retired Civil Servant, without pension or gratuity of any kind whatever... Lord Milner has ceased to be a factor in public life."

The amendment was carried by 355 votes to 135. A counter-demonstration was organised by Sir Bartle Frere, and a public address, signed by over 370,000 persons, was presented to Lord Milner expressing high appreciation of the services rendered by him in Africa to the Crown and empire.

=== Imperialist and political advocacy ===
Having established himself in his Johannesburg farewell address as a leading advocate of imperial unity, Milner continued to press the issue in Britain. He further developed his thesis in a magazine article written in view of the 1907 Imperial Conference in London which advocated the creation of a permanent deliberative imperial council and favoured preferential trade relations between the United Kingdom and the other members of the empire. In later years, he took an active part in advocating the causes of tariff reform and Imperial Preference.

In the period 1909–11, Milner was a strong opponent of the People's Budget of David Lloyd George and the subsequent attempt of the Liberal government to curb the powers of the House of Lords.

According to historian Caroline Elkins, Milner "firmly believed in racial hierarchy." Milner advanced ideas of British superiority and state-directed social engineering. Milner published his nationalist-imperialist credo:

"I am a Nationalist and not a cosmopolitan .... I am a British (indeed primarily an English) Nationalist. If I am also an Imperialist, it is because the destiny of the English race, owing to its insular position and long supremacy at sea, has been to strike roots in different parts of the world. I am an Imperialist and not a Little Englander because I am a British Race Patriot ... The British State must follow the race, must comprehend it, wherever it settles in appreciable numbers as an independent community. If the swarms constantly being thrown off by the parent hive are lost to the State, the State is irreparably weakened. We cannot afford to part with so much of our best blood. We have already parted with much of it, to form the millions of another separate but fortunately friendly State. We cannot suffer a repetition of the process."

==== The Round Table ====
In 1910, Milner and members of his Kindergarten founded The Round Table, a journal to promote the cause of imperial federation and expansion.

The introduction to the journal, first published in November 1910, reads:

It is a common complaint, both in Great Britain and in the Dominions, that it is well-nigh impossible to understand how things are going with the British Empire. People feel that they belong to an organism which is greater than the particular portion of the King's dominion where they happen to reside, but which has no government, no Parliament, no press even, to explain to them where its interests lie, or what its policy should be. Of speeches and writings about the Empire there is no end. But who has time to select what is worth reading from the multitude of newspapers and reviews? Most people have no access to the best among them, and such as have are haunted by the fear that what they read is coloured by some local party issue in which they have no concern. No one can travel through the Empire without being profoundly impressed by the ignorance which prevails in every part, not only about the affairs of the other parts, but about the fortunes of the whole.

The journal, still in publication, was renamed in 1966 The Round Table: Commonwealth Journal of International Affairs.

== First World War ==
Following the July Crisis, Milner became active in the British civilian war effort. On 27 May 1915, Milner was asked to head the National Service League – although Britain was one of the few major powers without a conscript army, and Milner and the National Service League advocated for universal conscription. His strong position forced a meeting with the King at Windsor Castle on 28 August 1915. Ultimately, a policy of conscription was adopted in July 1916. Lord Milner's speech in the House of Lords on 19 April 1916 strengthened the new law conscripting married men, "making all men of military age liable of being called up to service until the war ends." (Note: The Bill was passed by Parliament on 4 May 1916.)

Milner was also an outspoken critic of the Gallipoli campaign, speaking in the House of Lords on 14 October 1915 and 8 November 1915, and suggesting a withdrawal.

=== Monday Night Cabal and defeat of Asquith government ===
Beginning in early 1916, Leo Amery hosted informal meetings of a ginger group of members of Parliament to discuss the war effort. The group centered on Amery, Milner, George Carson, Geoffrey Dawson (who had been part of Milner's Kindergarten in South Africa), Waldorf Astor and F. S. Oliver. Others attending included Henry Wilson, Edward Carson, and Philip Kerr. On 30 September 1915, Minister of Munitions David Lloyd George attended one of these meetings and established Milner as one of his advisors. The two established close relations.

Beginning on 17 January 1916, the ginger group attendees discussed the setup of a new, small war cabinet to depose the Asquith coalition ministry. Amery later described the Asquith cabinet as an "assembling of twenty-three gentlemen without any idea of what they were going to talk about, eventually dispersing for lunch without any idea of what they had really discussed or decided, and certainly without any recollection on either point three months later". Following the death of Lord Kitchener aboard HMS Hampshire on 5 June 1916, Milner was mentioned as a possible Secretary of State for War, though the role went to Lloyd George. Milner also declined the opportunity to chair the Dardanelles Commission investigating the Gallipoli campaign. Instead, he committed himself to supervising the government's three coal committees at the request of Lord Robert Cecil; he submitted his report on coal production on 6 November 1916.

With Lloyd George occupied with the duties of Secretary of State for War, Milner was now the government's most forceful critic. Milner continued to speak against the Asquith cabinet in the House of Lords, and Sir Edward Carson, who was Leader of the Opposition, delivered speeches in the House of Commons. The ginger group tried unsuccessfully to convince the members of Asquith's coalition government to resign, focusing on Lloyd George. On 2 December 1916, Lord Milner dined with Conservative Party chairman Arthur Steel-Maitland, who requested he draft a letter describing the war cabinet he envisioned. This letter was then sent to Colonial Secretary Bonar Law. On 3 December, Lloyd George and Asquith agreed to create a small war committee headed by Lloyd George and reporting to the Prime Minister. However, The Times immediately published an editorial announcing the deal as a cabinet reshuffle, criticizing Asquith and praising Lloyd George. Asquith blamed the editorial on Lord Northcliffe and Lloyd George and insisted that he himself must chair the war committee, precipitating Lloyd George's resignation from the government. Asquith demanded the resignations of all ministers with a view to reconstructing his government, but leading Conservatives Lord Curzon, Lord Robert Cecil and Austen Chamberlain declined to serve. Asquith submitted his resignation as Prime Minister to George V on 6 December 1916. The King immediately asked Bonar Law to form a government, but he declined, for Asquith refused to serve under him. The King then turned to David Lloyd George, who took office the same day and formed a national government.

=== War cabinet and Secretary of State for War ===
On 8 December 1916, Lloyd George asked Milner, the Briton with the most experience in the civil direction of a war, to join the new war cabinet, which was to meet the next day at the War Office. Milner happily accepted. He received a salary of £5,000 (£350,000 in 2020).

According to Maurice Hankey:

With the exception of Bonar Law, the members of the War Cabinet were all Ministers Without Portfolio. The theory was that they were to devote all their time and energy to the central direction of the British war effort, on which the whole of the energies of the nation were to be concentrated. To enable them to keep their minds on this central problem they were freed entirely from departmental and administrative responsibilities.

Immediately following the first war cabinet meeting, which lasted seven hours, Lloyd George praised Milner to the press. "He picked out the most important points at once", Lloyd George said. "Milner and I stand for the same things. He is a poor man and so am I. He does not represent the landed or capitalist classes any more than I do. He is keen on social reform and so am I." Milner remained one of Lloyd George's closest advisors throughout the war, second only to Bonar Law, and was responsible for negotiating contracts with miners, agricultural production, and food rationing. For instance, in response to the U-boat campaign and blockade of British ports in early 1917, Milner assisted the Royal Agricultural Society in procuring 5,000 Fordson tractors and communicated directly with Henry Ford by telegraph. Junior ministerial positions established to assist the war cabinet (known as the Garden Suburb) were filled with young Milner allies, including Leo Amery, Waldorf Astor, Lionel Curtis and Philip Kerr.

In December 1917, Milner was instrumental in the release of more than 300 conscientious objectors from prison, intervening with high government officials on behalf of the imprisoned activist Stephen Henry Hobhouse, the son of an old family friend, and Milner's proxy godson. Milner was also a chief author of the Balfour Declaration, which he drafted with Leo Amery, although it was issued in the name of Arthur Balfour. Milner was considered, "with Lloyd George, the most powerful advocate of a pro-Zionist declaration" in British government at the time. He was a highly outspoken critic of the Austro-Hungarian war in Serbia arguing that "there is more widespread desolation being caused there (than) we have been familiar with in the case of Belgium".

==== Mission to Russia (January 1917) ====
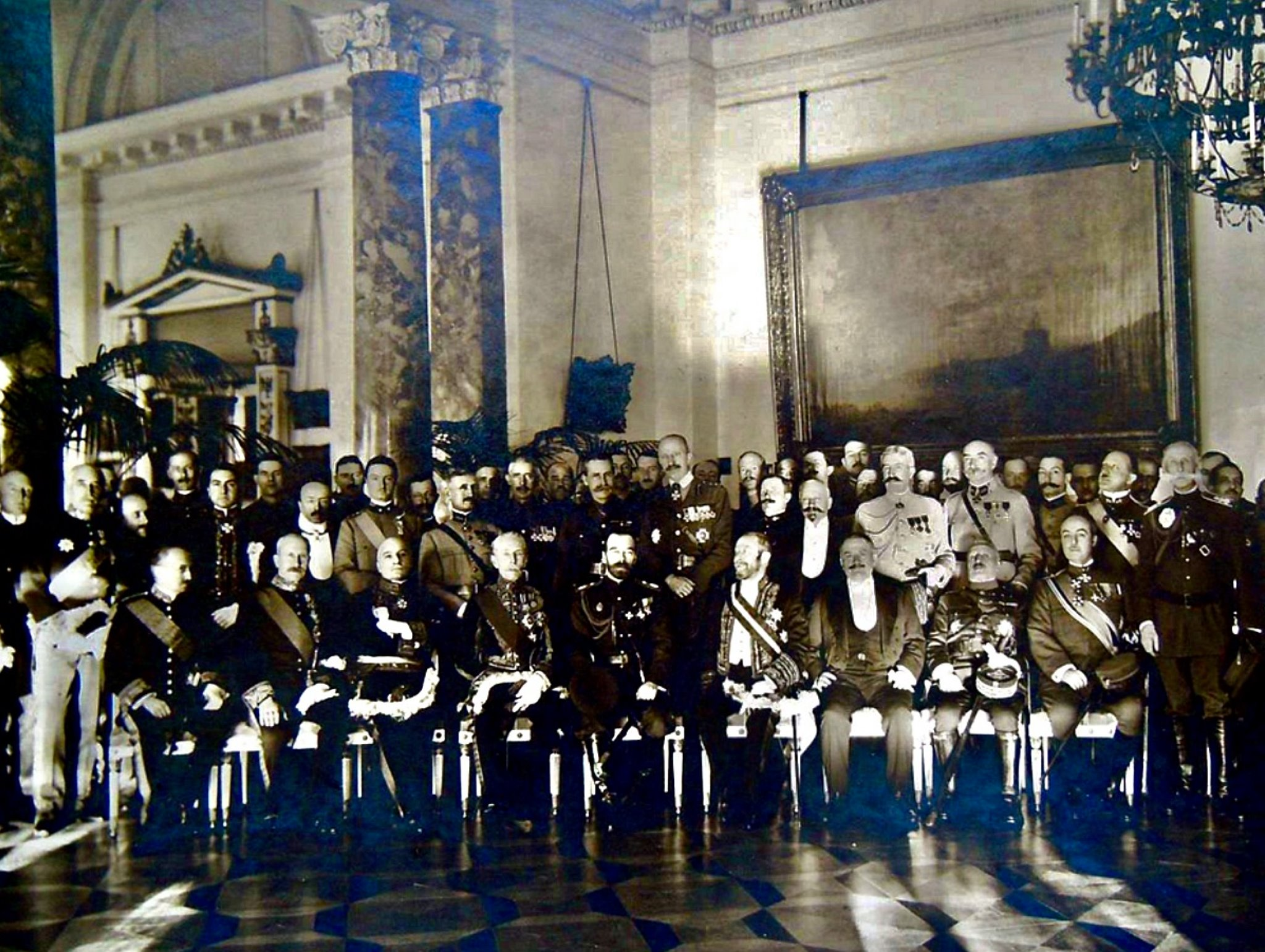
Lord Milner's mission to Russia

On 20 January 1917, Milner led the British delegation on a diplomatic mission to Russia aboard the Kildonan Castle. The object of the mission, stressed at the second Chantilly Conference in December 1916, was to maintain the Russian position in the war and synchronize its movements with the Western allies of Britain, France and Italy. However, the meetings revealed major equipment shortages and operational dysfunction in the Russian military, effectively negating their manpower advantage on the Eastern Front. British assistance was reduced to intervening with a task force to prevent allied stockpiles from falling into the hands of revolutionaries at the port of Arkhangelsk. The official report published in March 1917 was optimistic that even if the Tsar were to be toppled—which in fact happened just 13 days after Milner's return—Russia would remain in the war and would solve their "administrative chaos".

==== Flanders Offensive (1917–18) ====
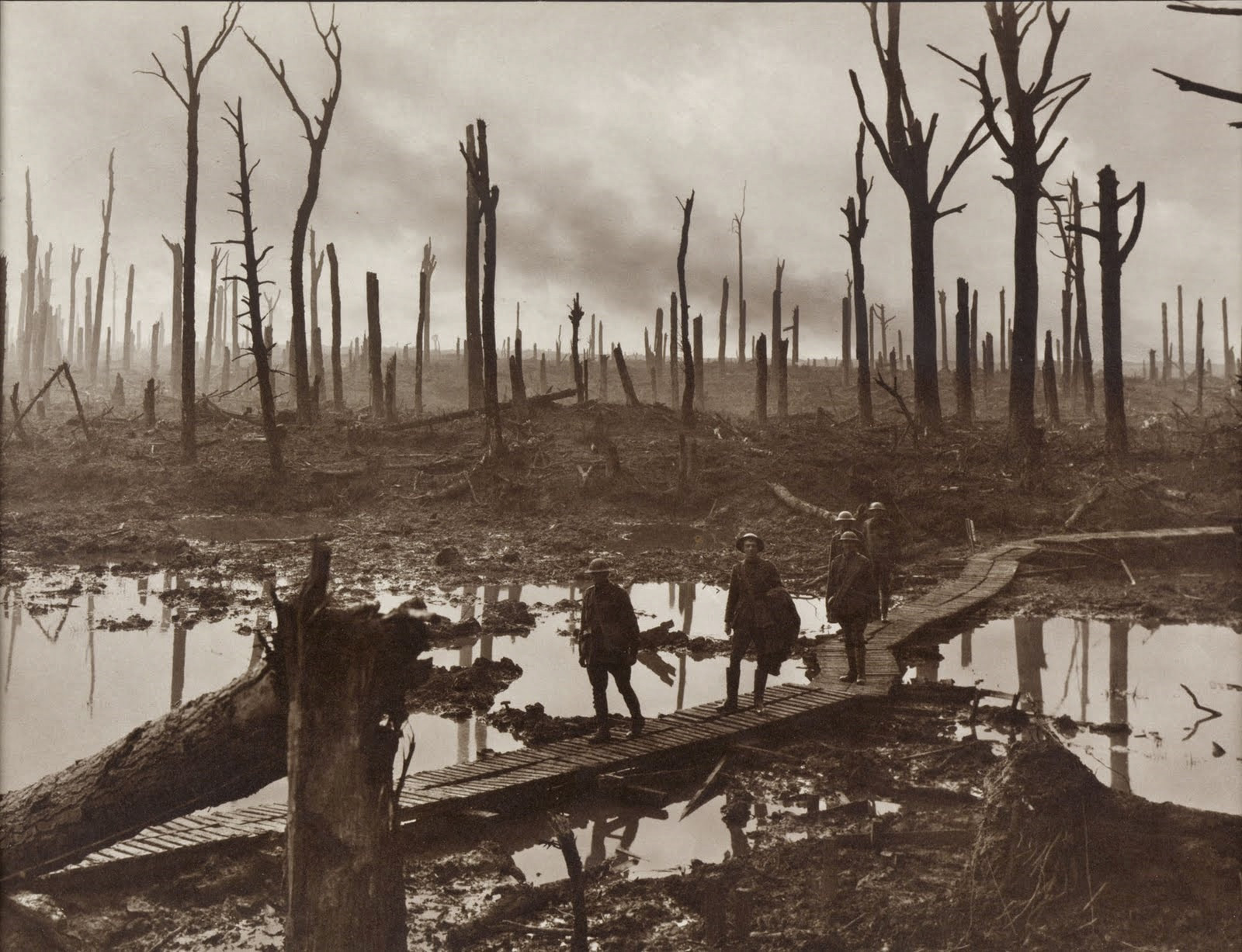
Australian gunners on a duckboard track in Château Wood, near Hooge, at the Battle of Passchendale, 29 October 1917

Milner was involved in every major military decision taken by Lloyd George's government, including the Flanders Offensive of 1917, which he, Bonar Law and Lloyd George initially opposed. The war cabinet did not insist on a halt to the offensive when the initial targets were not reached and indeed spent little time discussing the matter. By the end of the year, Milner had become certain that a decisive victory on the Western Front was unlikely and called for increased focus on other fronts. Milner was a leading delegate at the November 1917 Rapallo Conference in Italy that created an Allied Supreme War Council. He also attended all subsequent follow up meetings in Versailles to coordinate the war.

Milner and Lloyd George gradually became disenchanted with the military leadership, which retained political support despite little or no battlefield success, and Milner backed Lloyd George's removal of First Sea Lord Admiral John Jellicoe on Christmas Eve 1917 and General William Robertson as Chief of the Imperial General Staff in early 1918.

==== Imperial War Conference (1917) ====
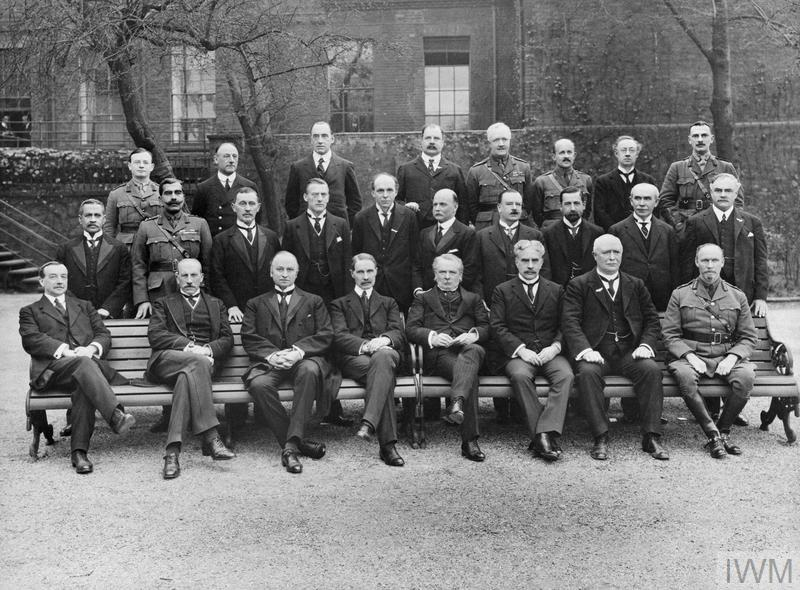
The Imperial War Cabinet in 1917. Milner is seated, second from the left.

Consistent with his position for imperial union, Milner proposed an Imperial War Cabinet which comprised the heads of government of Britain's dominions, giving each an equal say in the conduct of the war. However, the Imperial War Cabinet was criticized for diluting the British position in favor of foreign viewpoints.

In the closing days of the Imperial War Conference in 1917, the Imperial War Cabinet decided to postpone the writing of an Imperial Constitution until after the war. This was a task it never took up.

==== Doullens Conference and appointment of Ferdinand Foch (March 1918) ====
Following the March 1918 German advance on the Western front, wherein the British Fifth Army and part of the Third Army were easily routed and Paris was threatened, the Allies realized the need for greater coordination. The war cabinet debated withdrawing to the Channel ports and efforts were made to get as many men to the front as possible. In response, Milner personally travelled to Doullens to coordinate the Allied efforts and deputised Ferdinand Foch as Supreme Allied Commander on 26 March 1918. Milner wrote of Doullens,

On March 23rd, my birthday, I received a call from the Prime Minister who wanted me to go over to France and report personally on the position of affairs there. I left the next day. On March 26th, at 8 in the morning, I drove to a meeting at Doullens, France, arriving there at 12:05pm. Immediately I met Generals Haig, Petain, Foch, Pershing, their staff officers, and President (Note: "President" in this context means "President of the Council of Ministers", the official title of the Prime Minister of France, not the President of the Republic. The latter office was held by Raymond Poincaré who was also present at Doullens.) Clemenceau. The front had broken wide open in front of us, threatening Paris. There was confusion in the ranks as to what to do, and who was in charge. I immediately took the generals aside, and using the powers entrusted with me as the Prime Minister's representative, I deputised General Foch, making him the Allied Commander at the front, and told him to make a stand.

Milner's decision to deputise Foch was made over the wishes of Clemenceau, who preferred Philippe Pétain. Milner remarked to Leo Amery, who had driven him to the conference, "I hope I was right. You and Henry [Wilson] have always told me Foch is the only big soldier." Foch's stand was taken at Amiens, a town with a critical railway station, which, if taken, could have divided the Allies in half, driving the British into the sea, and leaving Paris and the rest of France open for defeat. The Battle of Amiens resulted in an Allied victory and turned the tide of the war, beginning the Hundred Days Offensive. When Milner returned to London, the War Cabinet gave him official thanks. According to George Barnes,

No better selection [than Milner] could have been made as British representative when the time came to bring about unity of command in France. He never got the recognition due to the part he played in the proceedings at Doullens when General Foch was appointed Generalissimo of the Allied Forces. It has been said that every one was by that time in favour of the step being taken, but even if that were so—and it had by no means been made clear to Downing Street—to Lord Milner belongs the credit of having given it the final push. At the Doullens Conference it was he who took out Haig and then Clemenceau and got their assent, one by one, so preparing the ground for final and unanimous adoption of the proposal.

Historian Edward Crankshaw adds,

Perhaps the most striking of all his exercises ... and certainly one of the most fruitful of good, was when as a member of the War Cabinet in 1918 he signed Foch into the supreme command, as it were between lunch and tea.

The appointment of Foch is memorialized by an inscription at the front of the Hôtel de Ville (town hall) in Doullens, which reads, "This decision saved France and the freedom of the world."

On 19 April, Milner was appointed Secretary of State for War in place of the Earl of Derby, who had been a staunch ally of Field-Marshal Haig, and he presided over the Army Council for the remaining seven months of the war.

=== 1918 election and peace negotiations ===
In the khaki election of December 1918, called immediately after armistice with Germany, the Lloyd George government won an overwhelming majority. Through Waldorf Astor, Milner personally funded the National Democratic and Labour Party, a new party composed of trade workers emphasising imperial unity and citizen service and opposing pacifism. The National Party ran 28 candidates in the 1918 general election, splitting the Labour Party vote and winning ten seats. In the years after the War, Milner was unhappy with what he saw as Labour inheriting the Liberal "indifference, if not to say hostility, to the Empire". It would have to rid itself of this if it was to ever become a "great National party". He attributed anti-national bias in the Labour Party to "superior persons" interested in eradicating working class patriotism and substituting it with class-consciousness.

Following the coalition victory, Milner was appointed Secretary of State for the Colonies. In that capacity, attended the 1919 Paris Peace Conference, where, on behalf of the United Kingdom, he became one of the signatories of the Treaty of Versailles, including the "Orts-Milner Agreement" allowing to Belgium the administration of Ruanda-Urundi territories to reward the Belgo-African army ("Force publique") for its war effort which highly contributed to pushing German troops out of the future Tanganyika Territory, as in the victorious Tabora and Mahenge battles.

==== Paris Peace Conference ====
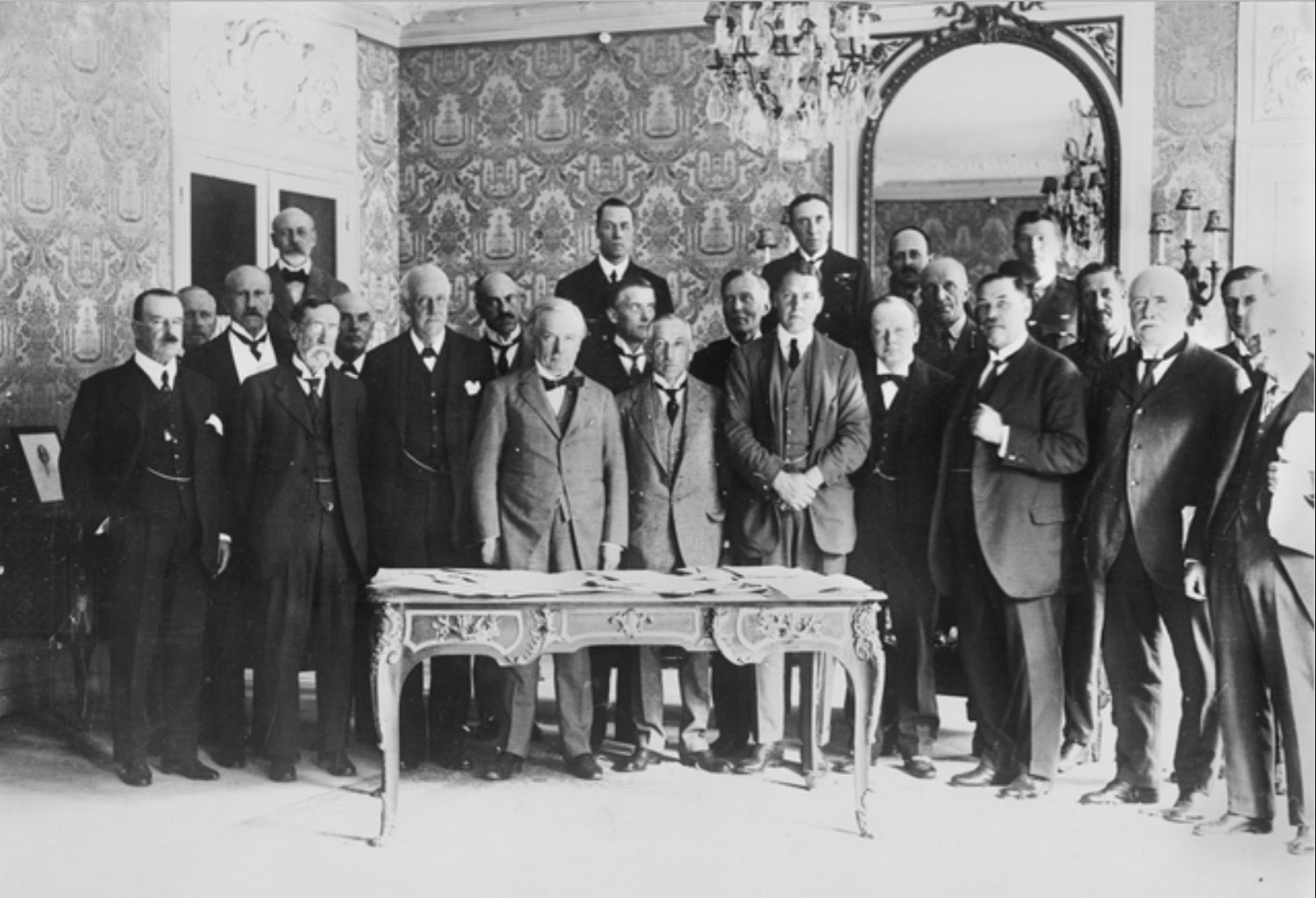
Rue Nitot: England objects to the Treaty of Versailles, June 1, 1919.

In his capacity as Colonial secretary, Milner travelled back and forth to France as a delegate to the Paris Peace Conference. From February 1919 until the treaty signing, he made five trips to Versailles, each lasting on average one to two weeks.

On 10 May 1919, he flew to Paris for the first time. The trip took two-and-a-half hours, halving the time it took by train, boat, and car. Milner and Arthur Balfour stood in for Lloyd George at the Conference whenever the Prime Minister returned to England for political business. As Secretary of State for the Colonies, Milner was appointed to head up the Mandates Commission by the Big Four, which would decide the fate of the German colonial empire.

On 1 June 1919, Milner was present at a meeting of the imperial delegation at Lloyd George's Paris flat at 23 Rue Nitot. At the meeting, Milner met with his former Boer foes, Louis Botha and Jan Smuts, one day after the anniversary of the Treaty of Vereeniging. Botha addressed Milner, saying, "Seventeen years ago, my friend and I made peace in Vereeniging. ... It was a hard peace for us to accept, but as I know it now, when time has shown us the truth, it was not unjust—it was a generous peace that the British people made with us, and this is why we stand with them today side by side in the cause which has brought us all together." According to Lloyd George, "In Paris, Milner joined with his former antagonists in resistance to that spirit of relentlessness which would humiliate the vanquished foe and keep them down in the dust into which they had been cast..."

Milner's wartime rapport with Clemenceau was expected to improve the British position. American delegate Dr. James T. Shotwell noted in his diary that evening,

"Things have got into a very bad condition here. This is no secret ... a part of the British Cabinet is up in arms. A remark was made to me last night that just as it was Lord Milner who came in at the critical point in the War and forced through the Single Command, it may be Milner who will save the situation again. In any case, whatever comes of it, this meeting of the British Cabinet is of great historical importance. Just how the Conference will develop now is hard to say. We may conceivably have an entirely new peace conference."

The Rue Nitot meeting determined the British Empire would object to the punitive measures of the Treaty of Versailles. Lloyd George requested revisions from Clemenceau and President Woodrow Wilson, stating that without substantial changes to reflect Wilson's Fourteen Points, Britain would not take part in an occupation or blockade of Germany to enforce the treaty. However, Wilson and Clemenceau declined, Clemenceau in particular refusing to budge on the war guilt clause and financial reparations. In the end, minor territorial concessions were made, the most important being a reduction in the occupation of the Rhineland by the allies from 20 to 15 years.

==== Signing of the Treaty of Versailles ====
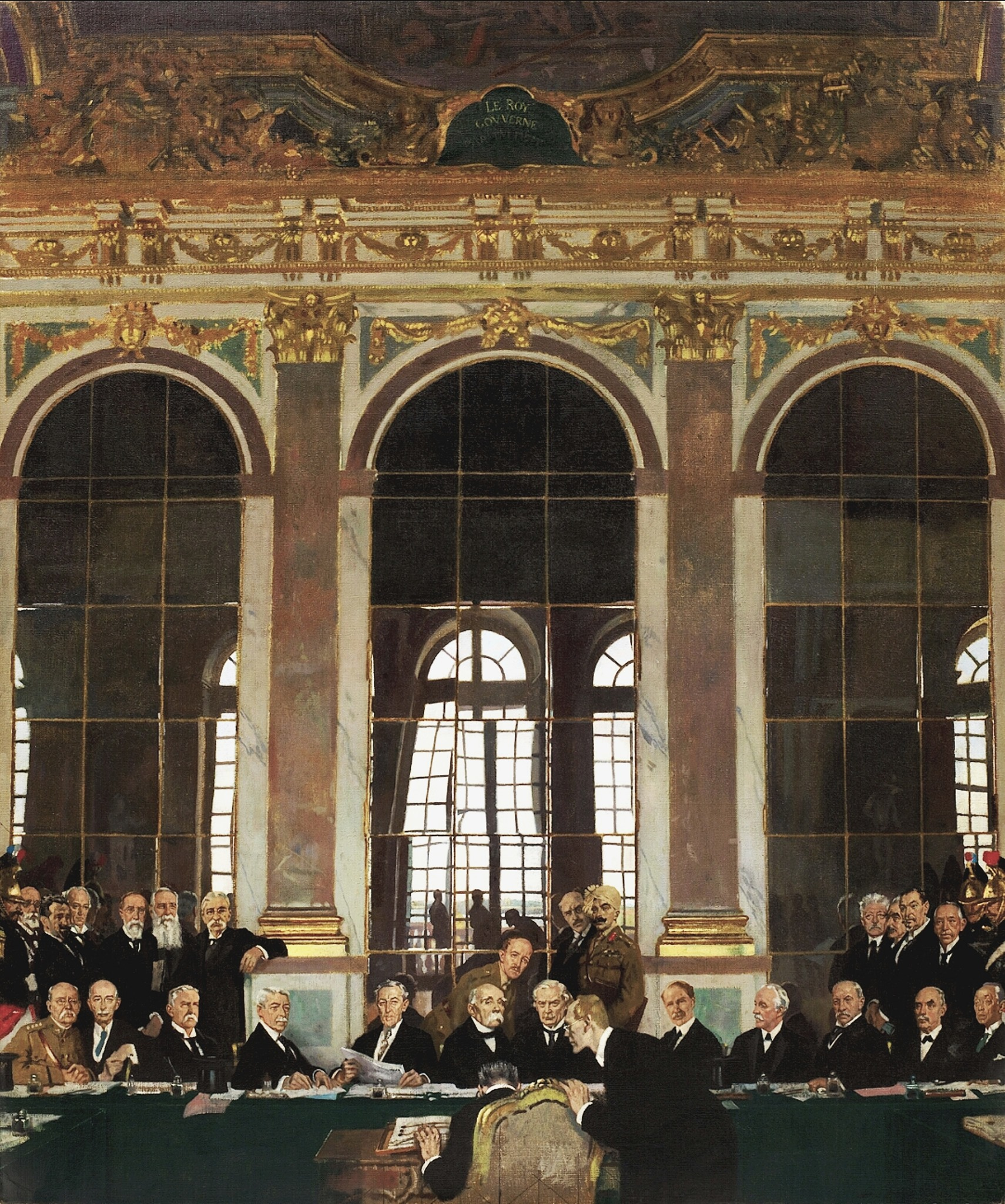
William Orpen's famous painting of the signing of The Treaty of Versailles. Lord Milner is seated, third from the right.

On 16 June 1919, the Allies gave an ultimatum to Germany and fixed the date of signing for 28 June. This caused a collapse of the conservative government of Germany on 21 June, and a rise of a liberal one. Two German delegates were then rushed to Versailles, arriving on 27 June. When the peace treaty ceremonies commenced at 3 pm on 28 June, and the German delegates entered the Hall of Mirrors, Lloyd George was unsure if they would sign or not, so he had them sign the document first, at 3:12 pm. The entire ceremony took an hour, with a total of 68 plenipotentiaries signing the treaty. Milner himself signed the treaty early, visiting the Hall of Mirrors after lunch, and was the eighth signatory overall. He recalled, "Though the occasion was such a solemn one and there was a great crowd, I thought it all singularly unimpressive."

== Personal life ==
In 1899, Milner met Violet Cecil, the wife of Major Lord Edward Cecil, in South Africa. Edward Cecil was commissioned to South Africa after serving in the Grenadier Guards. Milner and Violet began a secret affair that lasted until her departure for England in late 1900. Her departure had a noticeable effect on his disposition; Milner himself wrote in his diary that he was feeling "very low indeed". Edward Cecil learned of the affair and pushed for a commission to Egypt after Violet pushed to return to South Africa. After Lord Cecil's death in 1918, Milner married Violet on 26 February 1921.

Around the end of the Second Boer War, Milner became a member of the Coefficients dining club of social reformers established by the Fabian Society campaigners Sidney and Beatrice Webb.

Having worked closely with Cecil Rhodes in South Africa, Milner was appointed a trustee to Rhodes's will upon Rhodes's death in March 1902. Upon his return from South Africa in 1905, Milner occupied himself mainly with business interests in London, becoming chairman of the Rio Tinto Zinc mining company. In 1906 he became a director of the Joint Stock Bank, a precursor of the Midland Bank.

== Death and legacy ==
On 13 May 1925, seven weeks past his 71st birthday, Milner died at Great Wigsell, East Sussex, of sleeping sickness, soon after returning from South Africa. His viscountcy, lacking heirs, died with him. His body was buried in the graveyard of the Church of St Mary the Virgin, in Salehurst in the county of East Sussex. There is a memorial tablet to him at Westminster Abbey which was unveiled on 26 March 1930.

=== Legacy ===
According to the Biographical Dictionary of World War I: "Milner, on March 24, 1918 crossed the Channel and two days later at Doullens convinced Premier Georges Clemenceau, an old friend, that Marshal Ferdinand Foch be appointed commander in chief of the Allied armies in France." Today, at the entrance to the town hall stand two plaques, one written in French, the other in English, that say, "This decision saved France and the freedom of the world."

According to Colin Newbury,

An influential public servant for three decades, Milner was a visionary exponent of imperial unity at a time when imperialism was beginning to be called into question. His reputation exceeded his achievements: Office and honours were heaped upon him despite his lack of identification with either major political party.

Lord Milner is seated third from the right in William Orpen's famous Hall of Mirrors painting.

The town of Milnerton in South Africa is named in his honour.

He was lionised, along with other members of the British War Cabinet, in an oil painting, Statesmen of World War I, on display today at the National Portrait Gallery, London.

== Honours ==
- CB: Companion of the Order of the Bath – 1894
- KCB: Knight Commander of the Order of the Bath – 1895
- GCMG: Knight Grand Cross of the Order of St Michael and St George – 1897
- GCB: Knight Grand Cross of the Order of the Bath – 1 January 1901 – New Year's honours list
- KG: Knight Companion of the Order of the Garter – 1921

== Works ==
- Alfred Milner, England in Egypt (1894) online free
- Alfred Milner, Arnold Toynbee: A Reminiscence (1895) online free
- Alfred Milner, Never Again: A speech given in Cape Town on April 12, 1900
- Alfred Milner, Speeches of Viscount Milner (1905) online free
- Alfred Milner, Transvaal Constitution. Speech at the House of Lords 31 July 1906
- Alfred Milner, Sweated Industries Speech (1907) online free
- Alfred Milner, Constructive Imperialism (1908) online free
- Alfred Milner, Speeches Delivered in Canada in the Autumn of 1908 (1909) online free
- Government, A Unionist Agricultural Policy (1913) online free
- Alfred Milner, The Nation and the Empire; Being a collection of speeches and addresses (1913) online free
- Alfred Milner, Life of Joseph Chamberlain (1914) online free
- Alfred Milner, Cotton Contraband (1915) online free
- Alfred Milner, Fighting For Our Lives (1918) trove subscription
- Alfred Milner, The British Commonwealth (1919) (summary of, pgs. 197–198, 352: Link)
- Government, Great Britain's Special Mission to Eqypt (1920)
- Government, Report of the Wireless Telegraphy Commission (1922) online free
- Alfred Milner, Questions of the Hour (1923) online free ('Credo' in 1925 edition)
- Alfred Milner, The Milner Papers: South Africa 1897-1899 ed by Cecil Headlam (London 1931, vol 1)
- Milner, Alfred (1933). Headlam, Cecil (ed.). The Milner Papers: South Africa 1899-1905. Vol. 2. London: London. Archived from the original on 19 November 2016 – via Questia.
- Alfred Milner, Life in a Bustle: Advice to Youth (2016), London: Pushkin Press, OCLC 949989454

=== Speeches ===
- Farewell speech in the Transvaal on 15 March 1905;
- Farewell speech in Pretoria on 22 March 1905;
- Farewell speech in Johannesburg on 31 March 1905

== See also ==
- Oxford University - Lord Milner was elected Chancellor of Oxford University
- London School of Economics - Lord Milner was elected an Honorary Governor of the London School of Economics
- Pro-Jerusalem Society - Viscount Milner was Honorary Member of its leading Council

Government offices
Preceded by Sir Algernon West	Chairman, Board of Inland Revenue; 1892–1897	Succeeded by Sir George Murray
Preceded by The Lord Rosmead	Governor of Cape Colony and High Commissioner for Southern Africa; 1897–1901	Succeeded by The Earl of Selborne
Peerage of the United Kingdom
New creation	Viscount Milner; 1902–1925	Extinct
New creation	Baron Milner; 1901–1925	Extinct
Political offices
Preceded by The Earl of Derby	Secretary of State for War; 1918–1919	Succeeded by Winston Churchill
Preceded by Walter Long	Secretary of State for the Colonies; 1919–1921	Succeeded by Winston Churchill
