= Milner's Kindergarten =

British South African group of officials

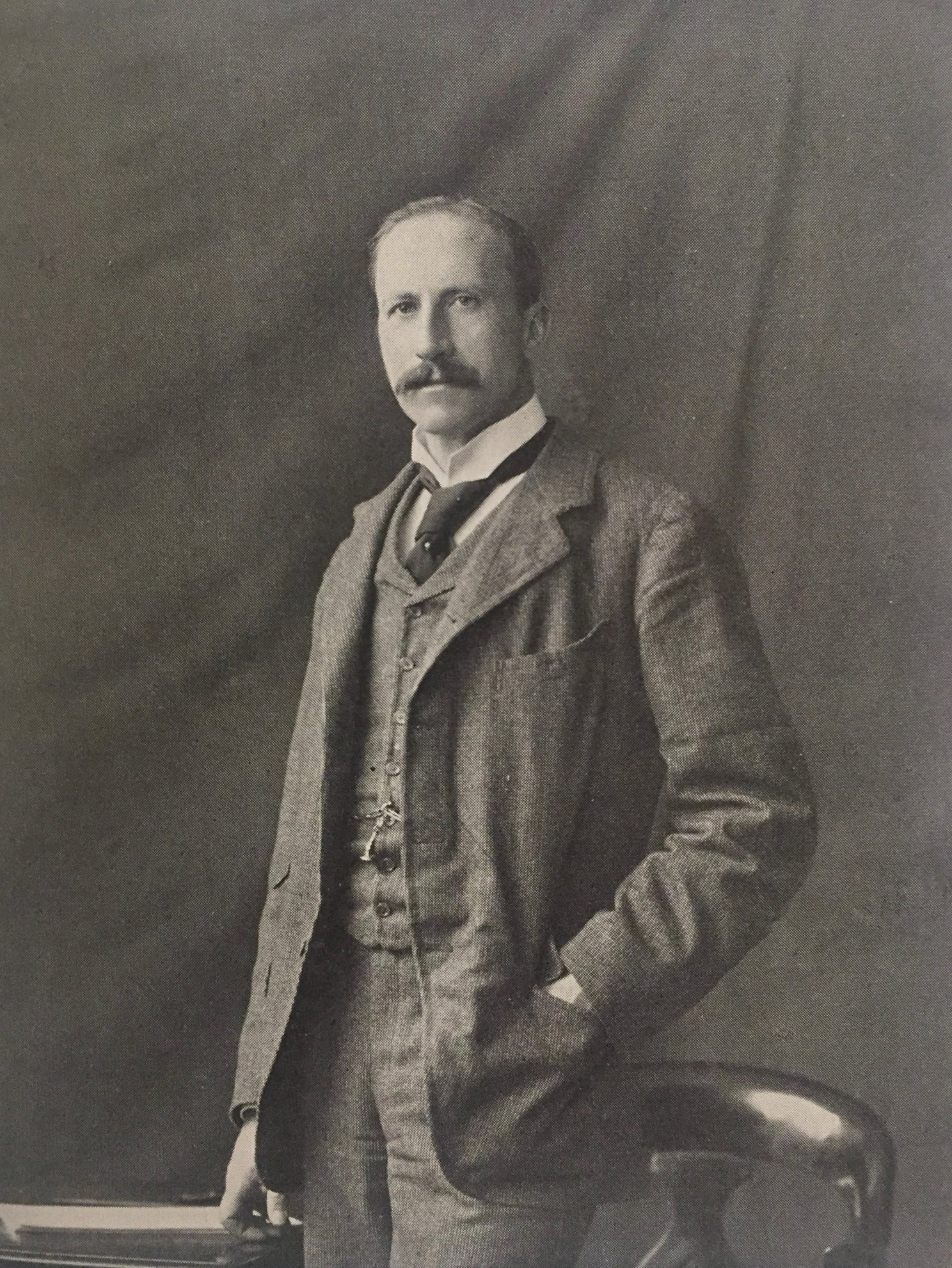
Photograph of Lord Milner in 1902

Milner's Kindergarten is the informal name of a group of Britons who served in the South African civil service under High Commissioner Alfred, Lord Milner, between the Second Boer War and the founding of the Union of South Africa in 1910. It is possible that the kindergarten was Colonial Secretary Joseph Chamberlain's idea, for in his diary dated 14 August 1901, Chamberlain's assistant secretary Geoffrey Robinson wrote, "Another long day occupied chiefly in getting together a list of South African candidates for Lord Milner – from people already in the (Civil) Service". They were in favour of the unification of South Africa and, ultimately, an Imperial Federation with the British Empire itself. On Milner's retirement, most continued in the service under Lord Selborne, who was Milner's successor, and the number two-man at the Colonial Office. The Kindergarten started off with 12 men, most of whom were Oxford graduates and English civil servants, who made the trip to South Africa in 1901 to help Lord Milner rebuild the war torn economy. Quite young and inexperienced, one of them brought with him a biography written by F.S. Oliver on Alexander Hamilton. He read the book, and the plan for rebuilding the new government of South Africa was based along the lines of the book, Hamilton's federalist philosophy, and his knowledge of treasury operations. The name, "Milner's Kindergarten", although first used derisively by Sir William Thackeray Marriott, was adopted by the group as its name.

== The Boer War ==
The discovery of gold in the Boer republics of the Transvaal and the Orange Free State, located within the British colony of South Africa in 1867, led to conflict between the two peoples due to the migration of British settlers ("Uitlanders") into the region. Perhaps out of fear of eventual domination from the British, the Boer governments refused to grant citizenship rights to the settlers. Negotiations failed to achieve results, and conflict eventually erupted. An attempt to overthrow the Transvaal Government in late 1895, in a raid led by British Colonial Administrator Starr Jameson, led to embarrassment for the English. The Jameson Raid led to the appointment of a trustworthy Governor, Sir Alfred Milner, on 15 February 1897. Still, negotiations with the Boers achieved little. Milner blamed this on the conservative, isolationist policies of Boer President Paul Kruger in the Transvaal and Orange Republics. To stand up to "Krugerism", the British decided to increase their military presence in South Africa, which led to a demand by Kruger that all the soldiers return home. When the British refused, the Boer Republics declared war. Their initial military successes were eventually overcome by superior British manpower. The war, which lasted from October 1899 to May 1902, was costly to both sides. It was highlighted by sieges and guerrilla warfare on the part of the Boers, and scorched earth tactics and concentration camps (to relocate Boer families) by the British. With Boer manpower eventually exhausted, a peace treaty was signed on 31 May 1902. The two Boer republics were then absorbed into the British Empire, in exchange for lenient treatment, rebuilding and financial help. Paul Kruger left South Africa for good, leaving the leadership of the Boers in the hands of trustworthy subordinates Louis Botha and Jan Smuts.

== Why Milner? ==
In response to the Jameson Raid, negotiations between the British and Boer sides came to loggerheads. For the first time, the Kruger Government openly defied the British, and it stepped up its importation of guns and ammunition, much of it from Germany. For their part, the British sought to replace Lord Rosmead, its high commissioner, who was complicit in the raid, and to soften his tough negotiating hand. After six months of searching, and with the approval of Prime Minister Salisbury, Colonial Secretary Joseph Chamberlain chose Sir Alfred Milner. Milner’s name was suggested to Chamberlain by Lord Selborne, the number two man at the Colonial Office, who was a friend of Milner’s. Chamberlain had met Milner in 1889 while travelling in Egypt, and Milner subsequently wrote a book, England in Egypt, which Chamberlain is said to have read and praised. After writing to the Prime Minister of his decision on 8 January 1897, Salisbury answered, “Your choice of Milner for the Cape, will, I think, be a success”. It is said by author Nimocks that Milner’s attitude toward the colonies paralleled that of the best politicians in government, so that may have been why he was picked.

The public was informed of the decision on 15 February 1897. Milner sailed for South Africa on 17 April. Before he left, Chamberlain told him, “to stand upon our rights and wait events”. After a year of studying the situation in South Africa, Milner wrote back to his boss and said, “Two wholly antagonistic systems-a mediaeval race oligarchy, and a modern industrial state, recognizing no difference of status between various white races-cannot permanently live side by side in what is after all one country. The race-oligarchy has got to go, and I see no signs of it removing itself." In fact, war did break out seventeen months later.

== Lord Milner's influence ==
As a result of the South African War, reconstruction efforts were Lord Milner's responsibility. The necessity to delegate responsibility into trustworthy hands prompted him to gather together a group of young men from Oxford University and the Colonial Office. At the suggestion of the Earl of Cromer, he said:

"...I mean to have young men. There will be a regular rumpus and a lot of talk about boys and Oxford and jobs and all that...Well I value brains and character more than experience. First class men of experience are not to be got. Nothing one could offer would tempt them to give up what they have...No! I shall not be here for very long but when I go I mean to leave behind me young men with plenty of work in them..."

Most of Lord Milner's proteges worked in the Transvaal, where reconstruction was needed the most. They continued in their positions after his departure for England on 2 April 1905, serving under Lord Selborne until responsible government was formed in 1907. The Kindergarten formed close relationships with one another, and all remained friends until the day they died.

== Work in South Africa ==
=== Pre Reconstruction ===
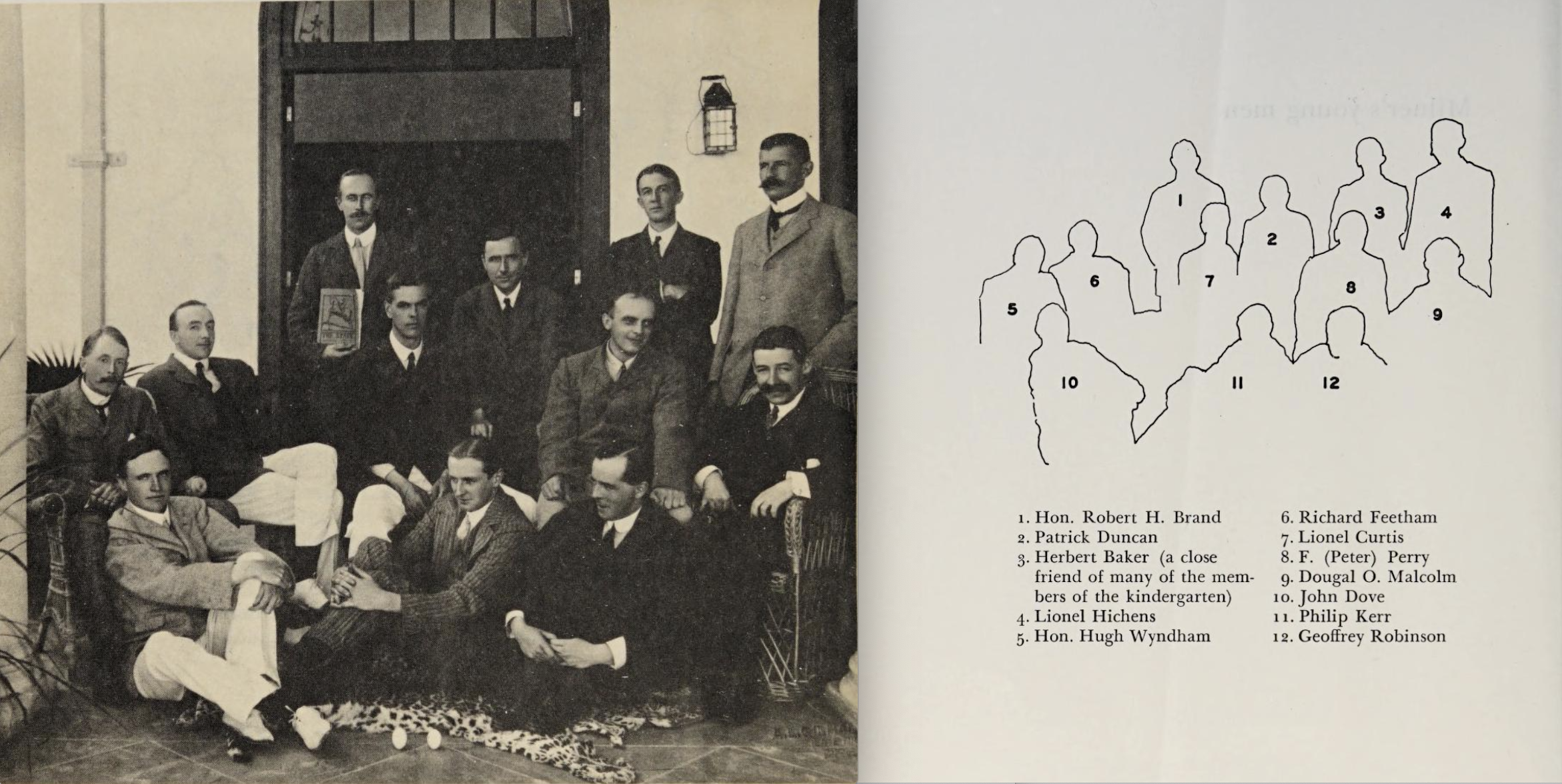
Milner's Kindergarten

The following personnel arrived before the Treaty of Vereeniging was signed on 31 May 1902:

The first person to be hired by Lord Milner was Peter Perry. A graduate of Oxford and an employee of the Colonial Office, he was sent to South Africa in 1900 to replace George Fiddes, Lord Milner's retiring personal secretary. In July 1901, he became Assistant Imperial Secretary with responsibility over native (indigenous) territories. He negotiated with the Portuguese to acquire native (African) labour for the mines. In 1903, he resigned and joined private industry to head up recruitment and working conditions of African labour on the Rand (greater Johannesburg).

Next came Lionel Curtis. Another Oxford graduate, Curtis came to South Africa in late 1900 and was employed by Perry as an assistant secretary. He was present for the writing of the Johannesburg Municipal Charter, and became the city's Town Clerk when the charter took effect. He also established a monthly journal, The State, with financing from Abe Bailey, to help unite the war torn country. In 1906, a book titled Alexander Hamilton found its way to South Africa, where, by chance, it was read by Curtis. It described Hamilton's role in creating the United States Constitution by listing instance after instance where the cause for a federal union (separate states reporting to a central government) was strong enough to make the United States secure and prosperous. The book was used as the basis for writing a new South African Constitution.

Third was Patrick Duncan. Duncan, an Oxford Civil Servant who worked at Inland Revenue, was invited by Lord Milner to South Africa in 1901 to become Treasurer of the Transvaal. He later became Colonial Secretary of the Transvaal, supported by Richard Feetham as Assistant Colonial Secretary, and John Dove as his assistant.

Like Perry, Geoffrey Robinson was another Oxford alumnus working at the Colonial Office. His connection as an assistant private secretary to Joseph Chamberlain brought him to South Africa in November 1901 to work for Lord Milner as his secretary. He later became Secretary for Municipal Affairs in the Transvaal. Upon Lord Milner's departure from South Africa in April 1905, Robinson became editor of the Johannesburg Star.

Hugh Wyndham, an Oxford graduate who travelled to South Africa for health reasons, secured a private secretariat position with Lord Milner.

== Later prominence ==
Many of these men themselves attained public prominence after their experience as members of Milner's Kindergarten. The group often met at Stonehouse, Sir Herbert Baker's private residence in Parktown.

The original members were:

- Robert Henry Brand, 1st Baron Brand (1878–1963): Upon returning to England, Brand became a managing director at the Investment Banking firm of Lazard Brothers, holding the position until 1944. In 1946 he was bequeathed the title of Baron. According to Carroll Quigley, he was the leader of the Kindergarten from 1955 to 1963. He wrote two important books,The Union of South Africa (1909), and War and National Finance (1921).
- Sir Patrick Duncan (1870-1943): While most of the Kindergarten returned to England in 1909, Duncan stayed behind. He entered South African politics, rising to become Governor General of South Africa from 1937 to 1943.
- Sir Herbert Baker (1862–1946): Although not technically part of the Kindergarten, Baker also stayed behind. He established an architectural firm in South Africa in 1902, he designed dozens of public buildings, he eventually returned to England, and was knighted in 1926.
- William Lionel Hichens (1874–1940): After leaving the Colonial Office in 1907, Hitchens found almost immediate success as Chairman of Cammell Laird & Co., a major ship building company, and later as the Director of various railroad companies.
- Hugh A. Wyndham (1877-1963): Upon returning to England, Wyndham became a professional writer, authoring a number of books on English history and Colonialism. He inherited the title of Earl in 1952.
- Richard "Dick" Feetham (1874-1965): Like Patrick Duncan, Feetham stayed behind in South Africa. A lawyer, chairman of the Irish Boundary Commission, and eventually a South African Appellate Judge, Feetham was the last surviving member of the Kindergarten. He died in Natal Colony on 5 November 1965.
- Lionel Curtis (1872-1955): With Lord Milner's death in 1925, Curtis became the de facto leader of the Kindergarten until his death in 1955. Returning to England in late June 1909, he was a founder and editor of The Round Table Journal. An Oxford professor in private practice, Curtis also founded the venerable Royal Institute of International Affairs.
- F. (Peter) Perry (1873-1935): Peter Perry recruited Chinese workers for the South African mines, he left South Africa for Canada in 1912, and like Brand, took up an Investment Banking career at the London-based financial firm of Lazard Brothers.
- Sir Dougal Orme Malcolm (1877–1955): Malcolm left the Civil Service in 1912 to become Director of the British South Africa Company, which he held for 37 years.
- John Dove (1872–1934): After returning to England in 1911, Dove became the chief editor of The Round Table Journal, a position he held until his death.
- Philip Kerr, the 11th Marquess of Lothian (1880–1940): Arriving back in England in 1909, Kerr was editor of The Round Table Journal until 1916 (paid £1,000 a year), private secretary to Prime Minister Lloyd George during World War I, and appointed a trustee over the Rhodes Trust in 1925. He was awarded a peerage in 1930, and went on to become British Ambassador to the United States of America from 24 April 1939 until the time of his death on 12 December 1940.
- George Geoffrey Dawson (1874–1944): Geoffrey Robinson (changed to Dawson in 1917) left South Africa in December 1910, after five years as editor of the Johannesburg Star, he joined The Times of London newspaper in February 1911, becoming its chief editor from 1912 to 1919, and 1922 to 1941.

Other members included:

- John Buchan, Lord Tweedsmuir (1875-1940): Upon returning home from South Africa in 1903, Buchan wrote three books in one year. He was elected to Parliament in 1927, and from 1935 to 1940 was appointed Governor General of Canada. A complete list of his many works can be found here.
- Arthur Frederick Basil Williams (1867-1950): Returning home in 1910, Williams became a writer, history professor, and English historian.
- Sir George Vandeleur Fiddes (1858-1936): Upon his return to the Colonial office in 1902, Fiddes served as Permanent Under-Secretary of State for the Colonies from 1916 to 1921. He received the highest order of knighthood, the G.C.M.G., in 1917.
- Sir John Hanbury-Williams (1858-1946): After returning to London at the end of 1900, Williams become Military Secretary to both the Secretary of State for War and the Governor General of Canada. He headed up the British military mission in Russia during World War I, before leading the British Prisoners of War Department in the Hague in 1917. Williams retired as a major general in 1919, and was knighted for a third time in 1926.
- Maine Swete Osmond Walrond (1870-1927): "Ozzy", a Colonial Office employee, was Milner's private secretary in South Africa from April 1897. He traveled to Egypt from 1917 to 1921, where, assigned to the Intelligence Section in Cairo, he assisted Lord Milner with his mission to keep Egypt in the Empire. Walrond received English knighthood in 1901. He was related to Philip Kerr.
- Sir Fabian Ware (1869-1949): Ware returned home in 1905. In the World War, he headed an ambulance unit for the Red Cross, was put in charge of Graves Registration for the Army in 1916, and become a permanent member of the Imperial War Graves Commission in 1919. He was knighted and recognized by the King for his service in both world wars.
- William Flavelle Monypenny (1866-1912): Monypenny returned to London in 1903, and while working for The Times, became a director of the company in 1908. He died of heart failure at the age of 46.

Many of these men continued to associate formally after their South African service through their founding of The Round Table Journal, which was established to promote Imperial Federation. Patrick Duncan's obituary in the journal's September 1943 edition, may best describe their ethos:

Duncan became the doyen [leader] of the band of brothers [in South Africa], Milner's young men, who were nicknamed ... The Kindergarten, then in the first flush of youthful enthusiasm. It is a fast aging and dwindling band now; but it has played a part in the Union of South Africa colonies, and it is responsible for the foundation and conduct of The Round Table. For forty years and more, so far as the vicissitudes of life have allowed, it has kept together; and always, while looking up to Lord Milner and to his successor in South Africa, the late Lord Selborne, as its political Chief, has revered Patrick Duncan as the Captain of the band.

== Non-Kindergarteners ==
Prior to the Oxford arrivals, Lord Milner had administrative help from the following officials:

- Lord Basil Temple Blackwood (1870-1917): Lord Blackwood was a secretary for Lord Milner from 1901 to 1907, occasionally filing in as Colonial Secretary and Deputy Governor. However, he was not involved in Kindergarten decision making. Blackwood was appointed colonial secretary to Barbados from 1907 to 1910. An artist, he illustrated many children’s books. He was a lieutenant in the B.E.F. during the Great War, and was killed in a German night raid on 4 July 1917.
- Sir Hamilton Goold-Adams (1858-1920): Sir Hamilton Goold-Adams was appointed Deputy Commissioner of the Orange River Colony in January 1901, rising to Governor in 1907. He returned to England in 1911, and was appointed Governor of Queensland (Australia) from 1915 to 1920. He died suddenly, of a lung infection, on 13 April 1920.
- Mr. Henry Francis (Harry) Wilson (1859-1937): arrived in South Africa in February 1900. First serving as legal advisor to Lord Milner, he was promoted and served as Secretary of the Orange River Colony from 1901 to 1907, where he played a significant role in its reconstruction. Returning to England in 1907, Wilson was secretary of the Royal Colonial Institute from 1915 to 1921, and was later knighted for his service.

== A step back ==
When negotiating the peace treaty, General Herbert Kitchener won over hardliner Jan Smuts by telling him that the upcoming British elections would probably result in the election of a Liberal Prime Minister, and with his election, he would likely allow the Boers complete self-government. With this knowledge, the Boers voted in favour of the treaty, 54 to 6. Upon the election of Liberal Henry Campbell-Bannerman on 5 December 1905, the Boers went back to elections and white-minority rule. In fact, Winston Churchill was appointed Under Secretary of State for the Colonies for the purpose of returning South Africa to the Boers. Some, but not all of the reforms instituted by the Kindergarten were overturned, and both Louis Botha and Jan Smuts rose as leaders in the new South Africa. However, the country remained loyal to the Crown, and both men played important roles for Great Britain during the First World War. The influence of the Kindergarten is hard to measure. During its time, modern democratic representation (for whites only) was introduced at the local level. Finances too, were under strict British control during the transition to British rule. The 5% tax levied by the Boers on the gold industry was increased to 10%, and in return, the new South African State received £9.5 billion in grants to rebuild. Meanwhile, the Lyttelton Constitution, which Lord Milner favoured, and which became law on 31 March 1905, was nullified by the Campbell-Bannerman Government, and the Boers were given complete self government in their former territories. Despite an orchestrated effort in 1906-07 to keep South Africa British, led by Curtis, Kerr, and Robinson, after popular elections in the Transvaal and Orange River Colony in 1907, 400 British civil service workers were dismissed. Although the Kindergarten's desire for an American-style federal republic for the four South African colonies was defeated in favor of a unitary government (all power at the top) in 1909, the Kindergarten continued to apply federalist principals in the Round Table Journal, in the belief that a federalist form of government was better than that existing in Great Britain.

== Post South Africa ==
In July 1909, with most of their business done in South Africa, Lord Selborne and many members of the Kindergarten returned to England. With experience under their belt, with Lord Milner as their guide, and back in their home country, they renamed their group the Round Table. The Roundtablers attracted additions of William Palmer, 2nd Earl of Selborne (Undersecretary at the Colonial Office), Waldorf Astor, 2nd Viscount Astor and F. S. Oliver (businessman and writer of a book on Alexander Hamilton). Despite their affiliation with South Africa and colonialism, which was a polarizing matter in much of England, "the group scorned any connection with political parties".

The dominant political factions of the day in England were the Unionist government and the Liberal Party. The unpopular war forced an early end to the conservative government of Arthur Balfour on December 4, 1905, and to the reign of conservative leadership (in place since 1895). With the generation of imperial leadership that Lord Milner identified with (Balfour, Chamberlain, Salisbury & Goschen) sidelined, he found himself on extended furlough. Meanwhile, the Round Table members drew closer together as a collegial group. Philip Kerr became good friends with Waldorf Astor, R.H. Brand intermarried with the Astor family, and other lifelong friendships developed. The group met at Oliver's country home, at Lord Salisbury's residence, at Lord Lothian's, and at Waldorf Astor's estate at Cliveden. They decided to get their message of the Empire out to the public and to authorities.

Initially, Lionel Curtis came up with the idea of a journal called Magazine, specific to each of the Dominions. This idea was liked by Lord Milner. However, for logistical and practical reasons, Milner did not know where all the writers would come from, or who would pay for it. Ultimately, one magazine was published, called The Round Table, a Quarterly Review of the Politics of the British Empire, with most of the funding coming from South African mining magnate Abe Bailey, and the rest from the Rhodes Family Trust. The first issue was published in November 1910. Although its name was changed in 1966, it is still published today as The Round Table: The Commonwealth Journal of International Affairs.

== Sources ==
- Internet Archive Please sign up (for free) to view links to sources and footnotes.
- Amery, Leo S., My Political Life, Vol. I, "England Before The Storm", 1896-1914, London: Hutchinson, 1953
- Buchan, John, Memory Hold-the-Door, Toronto, Musson, 1940
- Butler, J. R. M., Lord Lothian (Philip Kerr) 1882 - 1940, London: MacMillan, 1960
- Cana, Frank Richardson (1911). "South Africa" . In Chisholm, Hugh (ed.). Encyclopædia Britannica. Vol. 25 (11th ed.). Cambridge University Press. pp. 463–485.
- CIA Factbook: South Africa
- Garvin, J. L., The Life of Joseph Chamberlain, Volume Three, London: MacMillan, 1934
- Gollin, Alfred M., Proconsul in Politics, a study of Lord Milner in Opposition and in Power, New York: MacMillan, 1964
- Headlam, Cecil, The Milner Papers, Volume II, London: Cassell, 1933
- Kendle, John, The Round Table Union and Imperial Union, Toronto: University of Toronto, 1975
- Marlowe, John, Milner, Apostle of Empire, London: Hamish Hamilton, 1976
- Nimocks, Walter, Milner's Young Men,, Durham: Duke University, 1968
- O'Brien, Terence H., Milner: Viscount Milner of St. James's and Cape Town, London: Constable, 1979
- Oliver, Vere Langford, History of the Island of Antigua, Vol. II, London: Mitchell & Hughes, 1896
- The Round Table: The Commonwealth Journal of International Affairs
- Thompson, J. Lee, Forgotten Patriot, Danvers: Rosemont, 2007
- Thompson, J. Lee, A Wider Patriotism: Alfred Milner and the British Empire, London: Pickering, 2007
- Thompson, L.M., The Unification of South Africa, 1902-1910, London: Oxford, 1960
- The Times (of London), digital archives (apologies: "The Times" now requires a paid subscription)
- Worsfold, W. Basil, The Reconstruction of the New Colonies Under Lord Milner, Volume I, London: Kegan Paul, 1913
- Wrench, John Evelyn, Geoffrey Dawson and Our Times, London: Hutchinson, 1955
- Wrench, John Evelyn, Alfred Lord Milner: The Man of No Illusions, London: Eyre & Spottiswoode, 1958
