= Richard Feetham =

South African judge and politician

Richard Feethham CMG
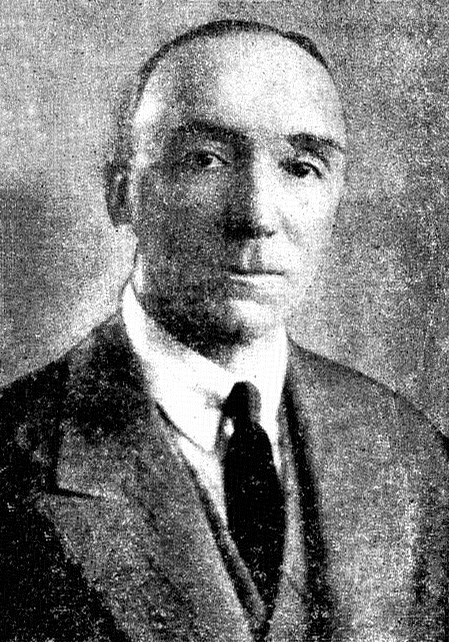
- Feetham in 1932

Judge, Transvaal Division of Supreme Court
- In office 1923–1930

Judge President, Natal Provincial Division
- In office 1930–1930

Judge of Appeal, South Africa Court of Appeals
- In office 1939–1945

Personal details
- Born: 22 November 1874
- Died: 5 November 1965 (aged 90) Pietermaritzburg, Natal

Richard Feetham CMG (1874–1965) was a lawyer, politician and judge in South Africa. He was also the chairman of a number of high-profile international and domestic commissions.

== Early life ==
Feetham was born on 22 November 1874 in Penrhos, Monmouthshire, the fifth son of the Reverend William and Mary Feetham; he was educated at Marlborough College and New College, Oxford. He read law in Lincoln's Inn and was called to the bar in 1899. He served with the Inns of Court Rifles in the Second Boer War. He was one of the young lawyers selected by Lord Milner to assist him in a policy of reconstruction following the Treaty of Vereeniging, who became known as "Milner's Kindergarten".

== Legal career ==
Feetham became deputy town clerk of Johannesburg in 1902 and town clerk the following year. In April 1905, he resigned from the Town Council and joined the South African Bar.

Feetham was, apart from other work as a commissioner, also appointed "to enquire into and report upon the facts relating to the tenure by natives of their lots in the Potchefstroom native location" and after he completed this work, its findings were reported in 1906 by the Government Printer, Pretoria. This commission's work was undertaken because of the claims of the residents of the old native location that members of the Town Council (Stadsraad) in 1888 gave them verbal assurances of a perpetual right of occupation of their stands as long as they paid their annual rent.

He was legal adviser to Lord Selborne, the High Commissioner in 1907 and a member of the Legislative Council of the Transvaal from (1907–1910). In 1915 he was elected to the House of Assembly of South Africa for the Parktown constituency in Johannesburg. During World War I, Feetham was an officer in the South African Cape Corps and served in East Africa and Egypt.

He was awarded a CMG in 1923 for his services as legal adviser to the High Commissioner for South Africa.

== Judicial career ==
Feetham resigned from Parliament in 1923 to become a judge of the Transvaal Division of the Supreme Court. In 1930, he was appointed Judge President of the Natal Provincial Division succeeding Dove Wilson. In this role, Feetham was able to show his "towering intellect" and "outstanding leadership qualities" to bring about a change for the better in the status of the Natal Court.

In 1939, Feetham became Judge of Appeal on the South Africa Court of Appeals in Bloemfontein, South Africa's "judicial capital". He retired in 1945.

== University of the Witwatersrand ==
In 1948, Feetham was elected Vice Chancellor of the University of the Witwatersrand, Johannesburg. He became Chancellor in 1949. He opposed legislation prohibiting the admission of Non-White students to White tertiary institutions. He also played a leading role in the conference between senior members of the Universities of Cape Town and the Witwatersrand, Johannesburg, which led to publication of the booklet The Open Universities in South Africa (1957). He resigned from the position of Chancellor in 1961 and from the University Council two years later.

== Service as commissioner ==
Feetham served as an international and local commissioner on a number of high-profile commissions.

=== Feetham Function Committee ===
He was chairman of the Feetham Function Committee on Constitutional Reform in India (1918-1919). The committee's role as to meet with provincial governments and assess their response to the division of functions, and thereafter advise the British Government on what functions were to be transferred and what functions were to be reserved

=== Irish Boundary Commission ===
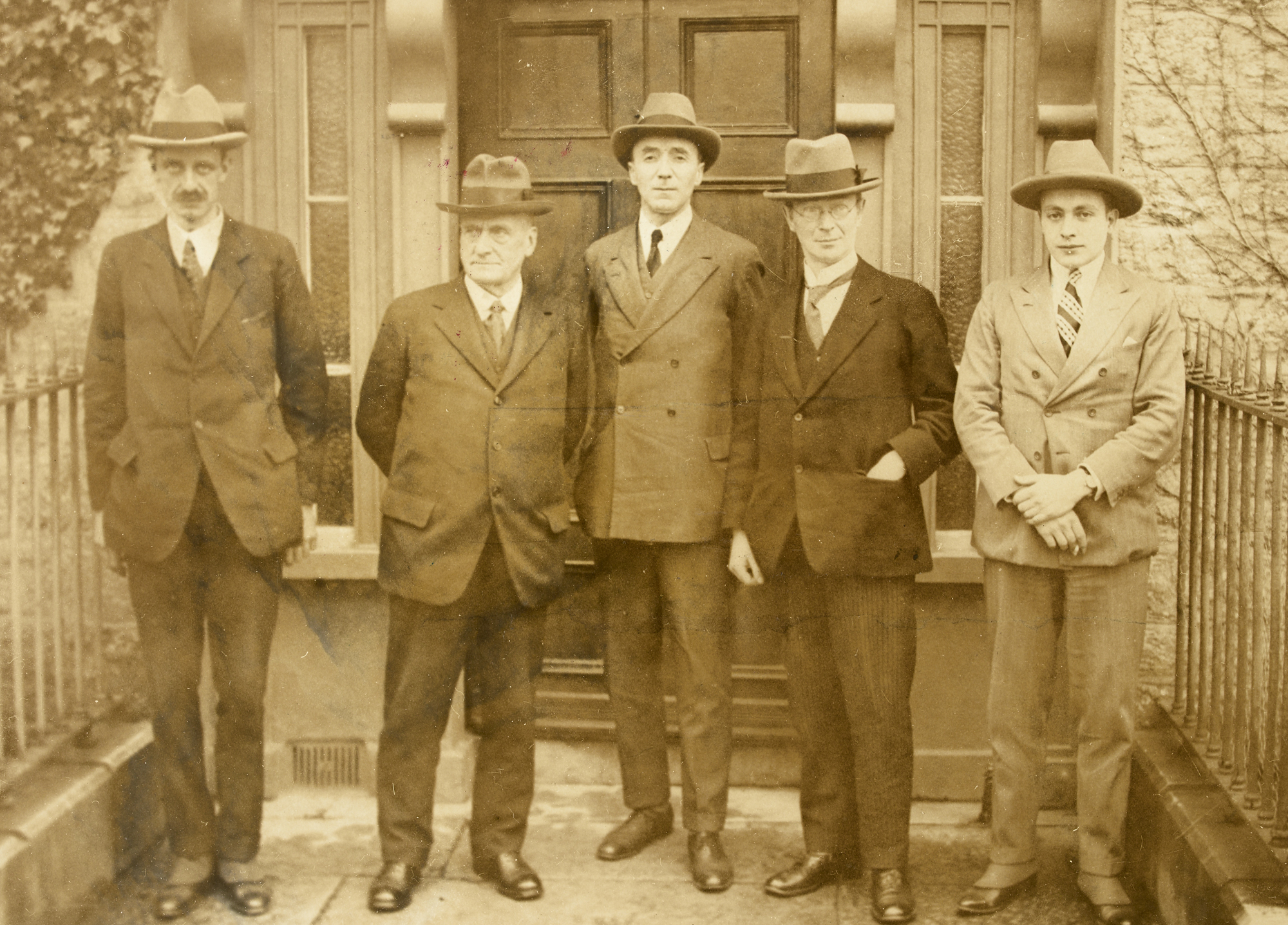
Feetham (centre) with other members of the Irish Boundary Commission

He was Chairman of the Irish Boundary Commission (1924-1925) which decided on the precise delineation of the border between the Irish Free State and Northern Ireland following partition in 1921. Lionel Curtis, Lloyd George's main Irish adviser wrote on the appointment of Feetham:

"Incomparably the best man I know for his purpose is one Richard Feetham KC, legal adviser to the Governor General of South Africa. He is an English trained Barrister and a member of the South African assembly who has been through all our constitutional work since Milner's time. On my advice Montague sent him out to India as chairman of a committee to prepare a scheme for the decentralization of powers of the central government. In four months he solved a problem over which the Government of India had been struggling with for over 20 years."

Despite these glowing references the Boundary Commission's report was completely unacceptable to both Northern Irish and Free State governments, and to Feetham's concern was buried, with neither party even prepared to admit having read it.

=== Kenya Local Government Commission ===
In 1926, he was appointed chairman of a commission to consider the development of local government in Kenya, including the ways in which local government could fund itself.

=== Feetham Report (Shanghai) ===
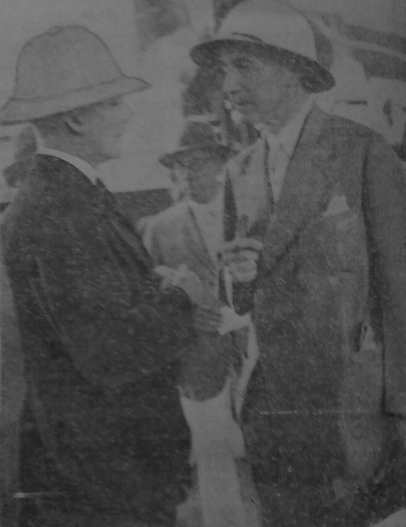
Feetham (left) talks with Ernest Macnaghten, Chairman of the Shanghai Municipal Council, in 1931

In January 1930, Feetham was appointed by the Shanghai Municipal Council to investigate the possibility of the end of extraterritoriality in China and its effect on the Shanghai International Settlement. At the time, the British Government was engaged in negotiations with the Kuomintang government of China to bring an end to extraterritoriality.

In his report, which was presented to the Shanghai Municipal Council on April 25, 1931, Feetham proposed that extraterritoriality continue at least in the International Settlement until China could form a united and pacified government with constitutional checks and balances.

=== Transvaal Asiatic Land Tenure Commission ===
Between 1932 and 1935 he chairman of a commission consider the issues around allowing Asians to owning land in the Transvaal. The Transvaal Asiatic Land Tenure Act and its subsequent amendments in 1934, 1935 and 1937 establish statutory segregation of Indians in the Transvaal.

=== Witwatersrand Land Titles Commission ===
Between 1946 and 1949 he was chairman of a commission to consider the ownership of land in Witwatersrand.

== Death ==
Feetham died on 5 November 1965 in Pietermaritzburg, Natal (now kwaZulu-Natal).

== Publications ==
- Feetham, Richard: Report to the Shanghai Municipal Council, Shanghai: North-China Daily News and Herald, 1931.
- Great Britain, Francis John Stephens Hopwood Southborough, Richard Feetham, Frederic John Napier Thesiger Chelmsford, William Henry Hoare Vincent, and C. Sankaran Nair: East India (Constitutional Reforms: Lord Southborough's Committees), London: H.M. Stationery Off, 1919.
- Feetham, Richard: Political Apartheid and the Entrenched Clauses of the South Africa Act; Dr. Malan's "Historical Facts." [Durban]: Defenders of the Constitution, 1953.
- Feetham, Richard: The High Court of Parliament Act and the Rule of Law Durban: Defenders of the Constitution, 1953. Print.
