= Robert Brand, 1st Baron Brand =

British civil servant and businessman (1878–1963)

The Right Honourable The Lord Brand CMG
- Baron Brand

Personal details
- Born: Robert Henry Brand; 30 October 1878
- Died: 23 August 1963 (aged 84)
- Spouse: Phyllis Langhorne (m. 1917; died 1937)
- Children: 3
- Parent(s): Henry Brand, 2nd Viscount Hampden; Susan Henrietta Cavendish
- Education: Marlborough College
- Alma mater: New College, Oxford
- Occupation: Businessman, civil servant
- Known for: Leadership of Milner's Kindergarten

Robert Henry Brand, 1st Baron Brand, CMG (30 October 1878 – 23 August 1963) was a British civil servant and businessman.

== Early life ==
Brand was born on 30 October 1878. He was the fourth son of the former Susan Henrietta Cavendish and Henry Brand, 2nd Viscount Hampden, Governor of New South Wales. His three surviving brothers also gained distinction: Thomas Brand, 3rd Viscount Hampden, and the Honourable Roger Brand were both Brigadier-Generals in the Army while the Honourable Sir Hubert Brand was an Admiral in the Royal Navy.

His mother was a daughter of Lord George Cavendish and his father was a son of Henry Brand, 1st Viscount Hampden, Speaker of the House of Commons.

Brand was educated at St. David's prep school in Reigate (1892-1896) and then Marlborough College (1894-1896), he graduated from New College, Oxford in 1901. He was subsequently elected Fellow of All Souls College, Oxford in November 1901.

== Career ==
From 1902, during the period of reconstruction following the Second Boer War, Brand joined Alfred Milner's Civil Service in South Africa, where he was appointed "Secretary of the Intercolonial Council of the Transvaal and Orange River Colony", and was thus seen as a member of Milner's Kindergarten, which, according to Carroll Quigley, he led from 1955 to 1963. He joined Lazard Brothers and Company in 1909, soon becoming a managing director. Brand was also the "Secretary to the Transvaal Delegates at the South African National Convention". He wrote The Union of South Africa, published by the Oxford University Press in 1909, which University of Cape Town history professor, Leonard M Thompson described as "a lucid analysis of the South African Constitution".

In 1915, Brand helped establish the Imperial Munitions Board, the Canadian branch of the Ministry of Munitions. From then until 1917, he served as the Board's representative in London, acting as the key link between that body and the Ministry.

He was also chairman of the North British and Mercantile Insurance Company, a director of Lloyds Bank and served as head of the British Food Mission to the United States between 1941 and 1944 and as the Treasury representative to the United States between 1944 and 1946.

== Honours ==
In the 1909 Birthday Honours, he was appointed to the Order of St Michael and St George as a Companion (CMG), for "services as Secretary to the Central South African Railways Board". In the 1946 Birthday Honours, he was raised to the peerage as Baron Brand, of Eydon in the County of Northampton for "services as Representative of H.M. Treasury in Washington".

== Personal life ==
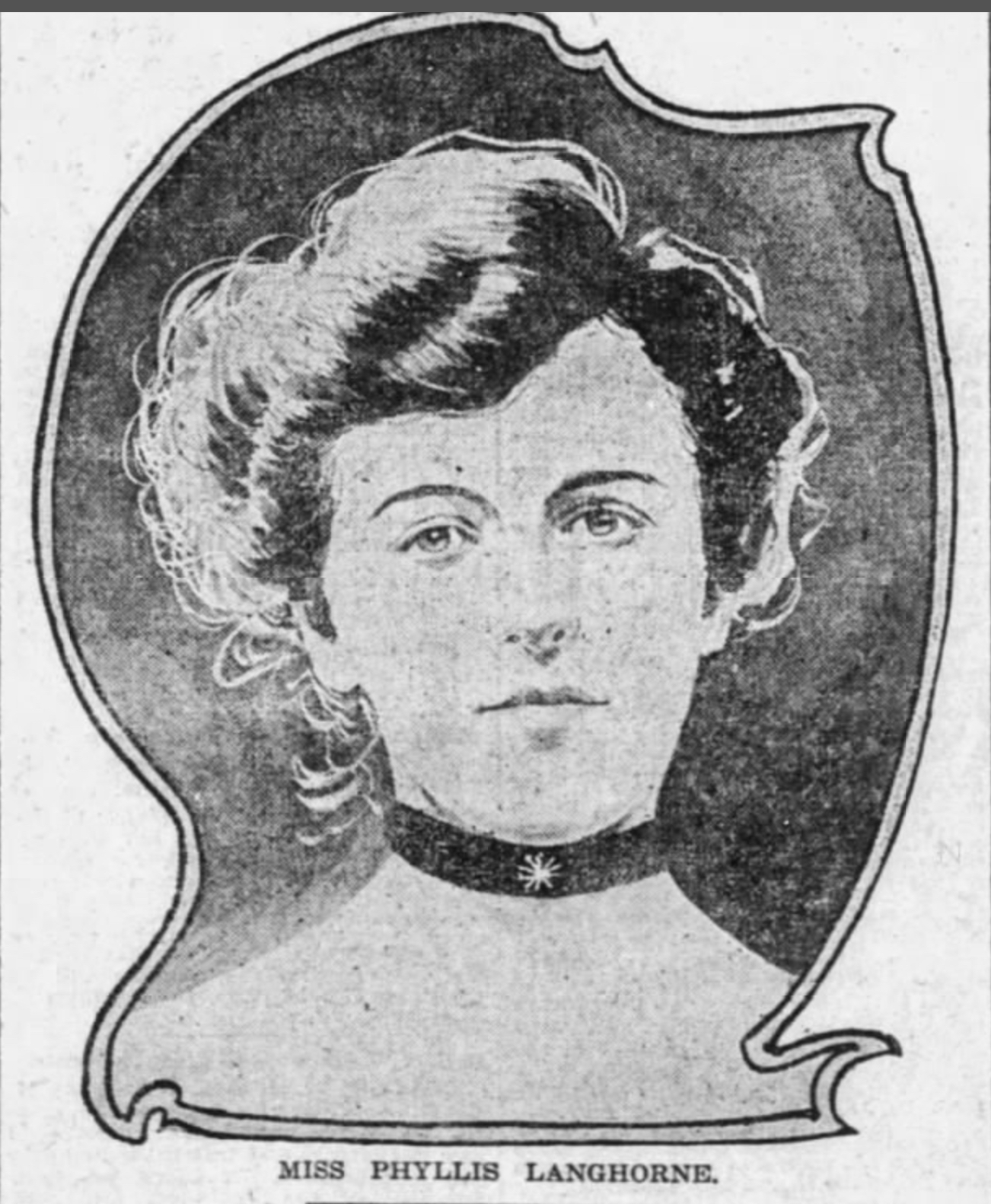

Lord Brand married Phyllis, daughter of Chiswell Dabney Langhorne and sister of Nancy Astor, Viscountess Astor, in 1917. They had three children:

- Virginia Brand (1918–1995), who married John Metcalfe Polk (1908–1948), the son of Frank Polk, the former United States Under Secretary of State, in 1952. After Polk's death in 1948, Virginia married Maj. Edward Ford (1910–2006), son of Lionel Ford, in 1949.
- Dinah Brand (1920–1998), who married Commander Lyttleton Fox. They divorced and she remarried Christopher Charles Cyprian Bridge (1918–1993), son of Charles E. Dunscombe Bridge.
- Robert James Brand (1923–1945), a lieutenant in the Coldstream Guards, was killed in action in the Second World War.

Phyllis died in January 1937. Lord Brand remained a widower until his death in August 1963, aged 84. As his only son had predeceased him, the barony died with him.

Peerage of the United Kingdom
New creation	Baron Brand; 1946–1963	Extinct
