= Anatole Bienaimé =

French architect

Anatole Bienaimé, born in Amiens, France, on March 10, 1848, and died in the same town on May 25, 1911, was a French architect who has practiced in the Somme and Pas-de-Calais with a large number of achievements in Le Touquet-Paris-Plage.

== Biography ==
Bienaimé was born in the suburb of Noyon in Amiens on March 10, 1848 from the marriage of Jules Henri, carpenter, an employee of an architect until at least 1880, and Suzanne Eugènie Pécourt. Bienaime's commissions included the Hôtel de Ville at Doullens.

He married Augustine Hélène Marie Becker; their children included another architect, Maurice Bienaimé.

== Training ==
Bienaimé studied at the Regional School of Fine Arts in Amiens. For his architecture lessons, he successively studied under Mr. Bernic in Paris, Mr. Herbault and Mr. Pinsard in Amiens. He was an architect in Amiens from 1 May 1880 up until his death.
