= Peter Wright =

Pete or Peter Wright may refer to:

== Writers ==
- Peter Wright (journalist) (born 1953), British editor of The Mail on Sunday
- Peter Wright (MI5 officer) (1916–1995), author and MI5 counter-intelligence officer
- Peter Wright (writer) (1880/1–1957), British author on World War I

== Entertainers ==
- Peter Wight (actor) (born 1950), British actor, sometimes credited as Peter Wright
- Peter Wright (dancer) (born 1926), British ballet director and choreographer
- Pete Wright (musician) (active 1977–1984), British bass player for the band Crass
- Peter Wright (organist) (born 1954), British organist
- Pete Wright, character in American 1950 crime film noir 711 Ocean Drive

== Sportspeople ==
- Peter Wright (American football), American football player in 1893
- Peter Wright (Australian footballer) (born 1996), Australian rules footballer
- Peter Wright (darts player) (born 1970), Scottish darts player
- Peter Wright (footballer, born 1934) (1934–2012), English football player for Colchester United
- Peter Wright (footballer, born 1982), English football player for Halifax Town
- Peter Wright (rugby league), Australian rugby league footballer 1970–1971 and coach
- Peter Wright (rugby union, born 1967), Scottish rugby union footballer and coach
- Peter Wright (rugby union, born 1931) (1931–2002), English rugby union player
- Peter Wright (sport wrestler) (1894–1982), British wrestler, bronze medalist at the 1920 Summer Olympic Games
- Peter Wright (squash player) (born 1943) Australian squash player, three-time World Masters Squash Champion
- Peter Wright (swimmer) (born 1972), American swimmer
- Peter Wright (tennis) (born 1963), Irish-American tennis player
- Pete Wright (ice hockey) (1927–1989), Canadian ice hockey player
- Peter Wright (engineer) (1946–2025), British engineer, working in Formula One motor racing

== Others ==
- Peter Wright (Jesuit) (1603–1651), beatified English Catholic martyr
- Peter Harold Wright (1916–1990), English recipient of the Victoria Cross
- Peter Wright (police officer) (1929–2011), British policeman
- Peter Wright (scientist), American scientist, NMR spectroscopist
- Peter Wright (mining entrepreneur) (1908–1985), Australian mining entrepreneur
- Peter Wright (ceramicist) (1919–2003), potter and sculptor
- Peter Wright (soldier) (1910–1986), Canadian soldier in WWII
