= Peter Wright (writer) =

British writer (d. 1957)

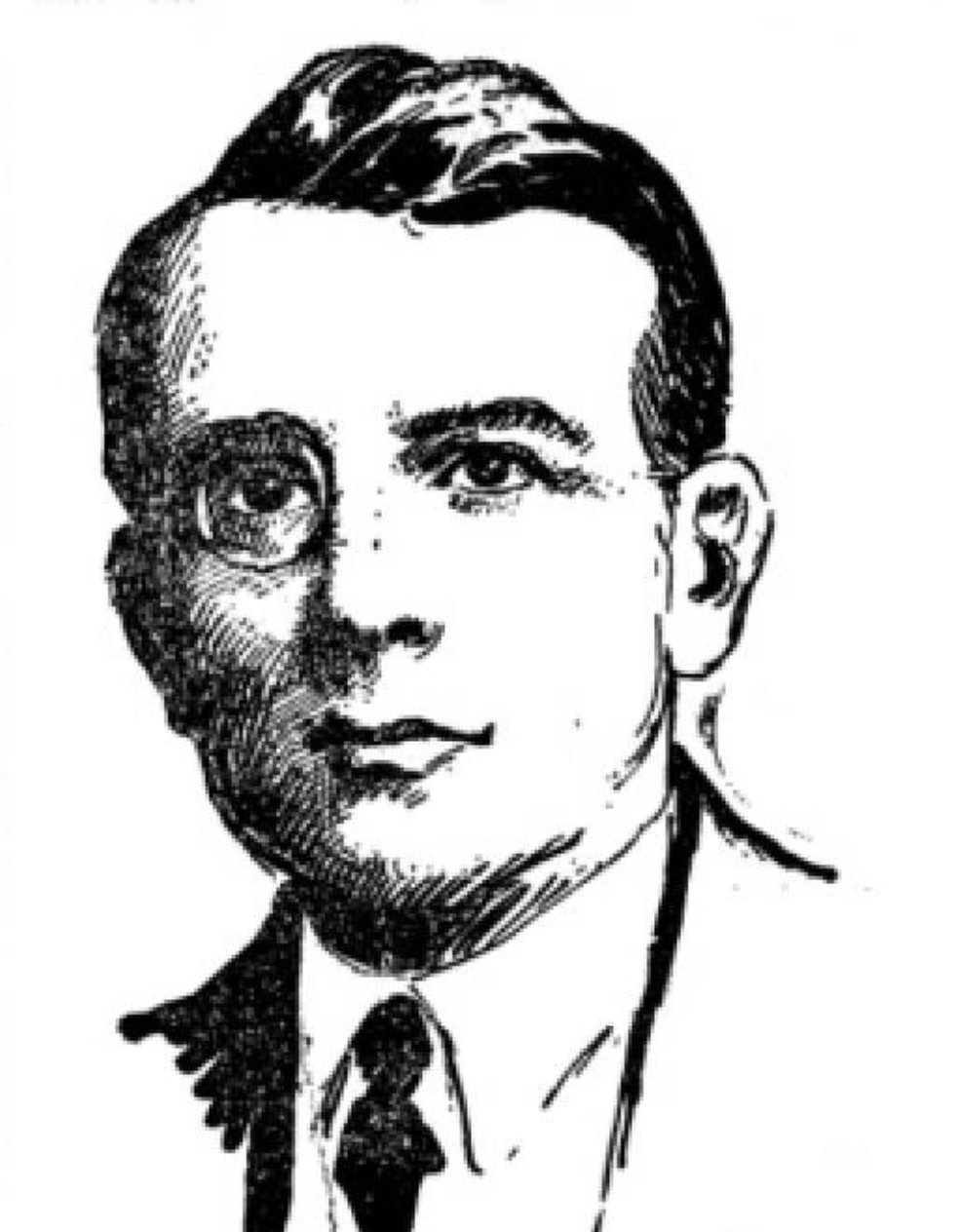
Peter Wright, author

Peter Emmanuel Wright (c. 1880/81 – 1957) was a British writer.

He was born in Paris to a Yorkshire bookmaker and was educated at Harrow School. He won an Exhibition to Balliol College, Oxford when he was 16 and a full scholarship at 17. During the First World War he served as a captain in the Machine Gun Corps and later, in Versailles, as an assistant secretary to the Supreme War Council.

When the idea of an Allied General Reserve was brought up at Versailles, it was to be placed under the command of an independent Controlling Board. The Board consisted of General's Foch (France), Wilson (UK), Cadorna (Italy) and Bliss (US). Peter Wright was the Secretary of the Controlling Board. When General's Haig, Petain, and Prime Minister Clemenceau conspired to ignore the order, in favor of a verbal mutual support agreement, Wright was a witness to this, and the ensuing German Spring Offensive that the reserve, if it had existed, would have stopped dead in its tracks. His ensuing book, “At the Supreme War Council” is critical of both generals for this reason. He wrote that the British lost 19,000 officers and over 300,000 men during the German Spring Offensive due to "a flawless jewel of perfect incompetence".

Wright's 1921 book, At the Supreme War Council, discussed Great War strategy and the failings of politicians and generals. The release of sensitive information almost had him charged with Defense of the Realm Act (DORA, i.e. national security) violations. His 1924 work, The Shirt, was a collection of essays and stories. On 11 June 1925 his Portraits and Criticisms was published. This was a collection of character sketches which included H. H. Asquith, Margot Asquith and Lord Robert Cecil. In the essay on Cecil, Wright said of William Ewart Gladstone: "Gladstone...founded the great tradition since observed by many of his followers and successors with such pious fidelity, in public to speak the language of the highest and strictest principle, and in private to pursue and possess every sort of woman".

Gladstone's two surviving sons, Herbert and Henry Gladstone, wrote to Wright on 22 July 1925: "Your garbage about Mr. Gladstone in Portraits and Criticisms has come to our knowledge. You are a liar. Because you slander a dead man, you are a coward. Because you think that the public will accept invention from such as you, you are a fool". In a letter to Herbert Gladstone, the publishers (Eveleigh Nash and Grayson) claimed that Wright inserted the offending passage in the proof stage of printing. The Gladstones sent a copy of their letter to Wright to The Nation and Wright replied with a letter to the Daily Mail. On 27 July Herbert Gladstone complained to the Bath Club that Wright ("a liar, a coward, and a foul fellow") had written letters on the controversy to The Nation on Club notepaper, which led to Wright's expulsion (Wright had replied to earlier criticism of the book in a letter to The Nation). Wright subsequently sued the club for damages and Herbert Gladstone for libel for his 27 July letter.

After the trial, which lasted from 27 January to 3 February 1927, Wright was awarded £125 in damages from the club for wrongful expulsion but he lost the libel case. The jury explained that "the gist of the defendant's letter of July 27 was true" and added that they were "of the unanimous opinion that the evidence which has been placed before us has completely vindicated the high moral character of the late Mr. W. E. Gladstone".

== Works ==
- Internet Archive (sign in to view footnotes and reference sources) Link
- At The Supreme War Council (1921).
- The Shirt (1924).
- Portraits and Criticisms (1925).
