= Dury, Compiègne and Abbeville meetings =

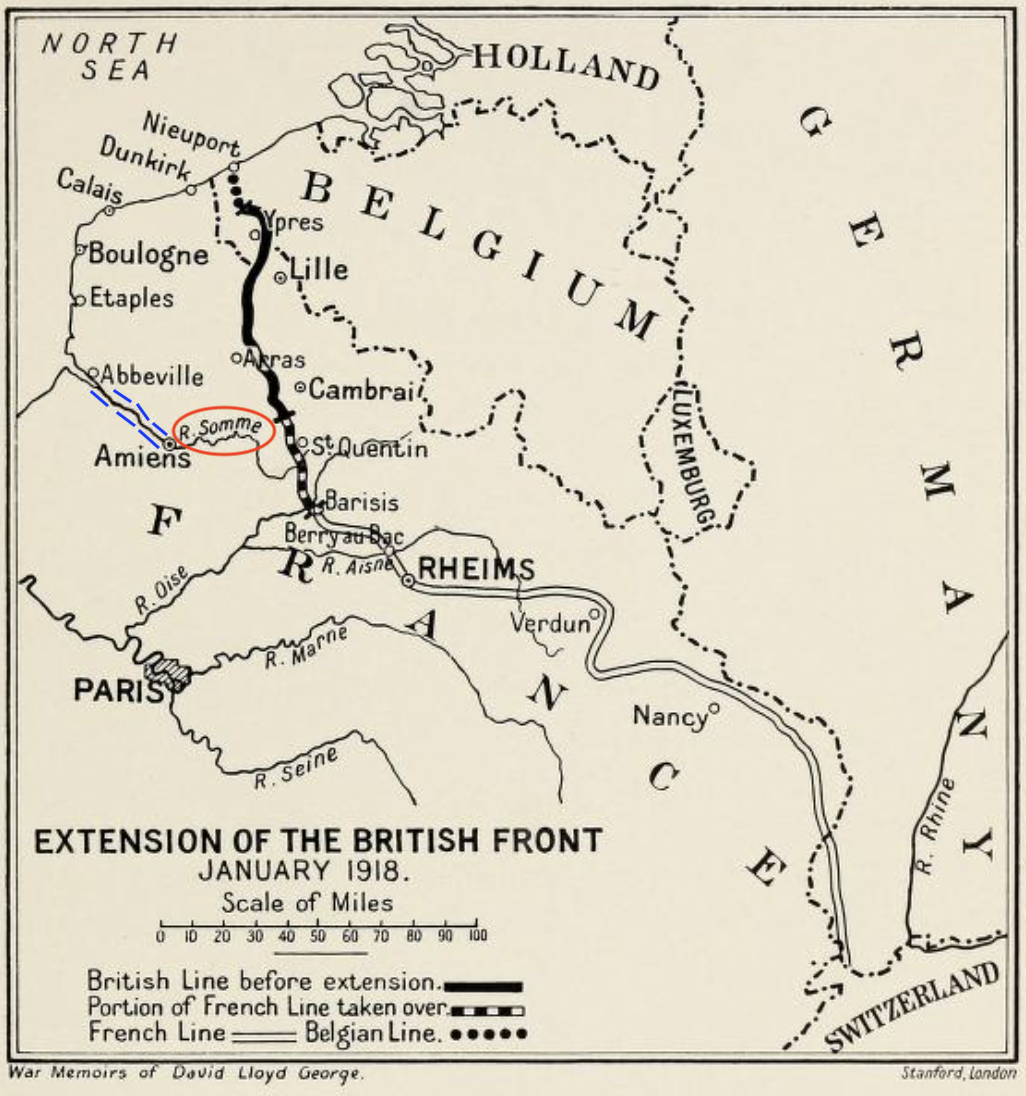
The Western Front, early 1918. Haig's request for 20 French divisions (in blue), and the North/South dividing line of the Somme (red circle)

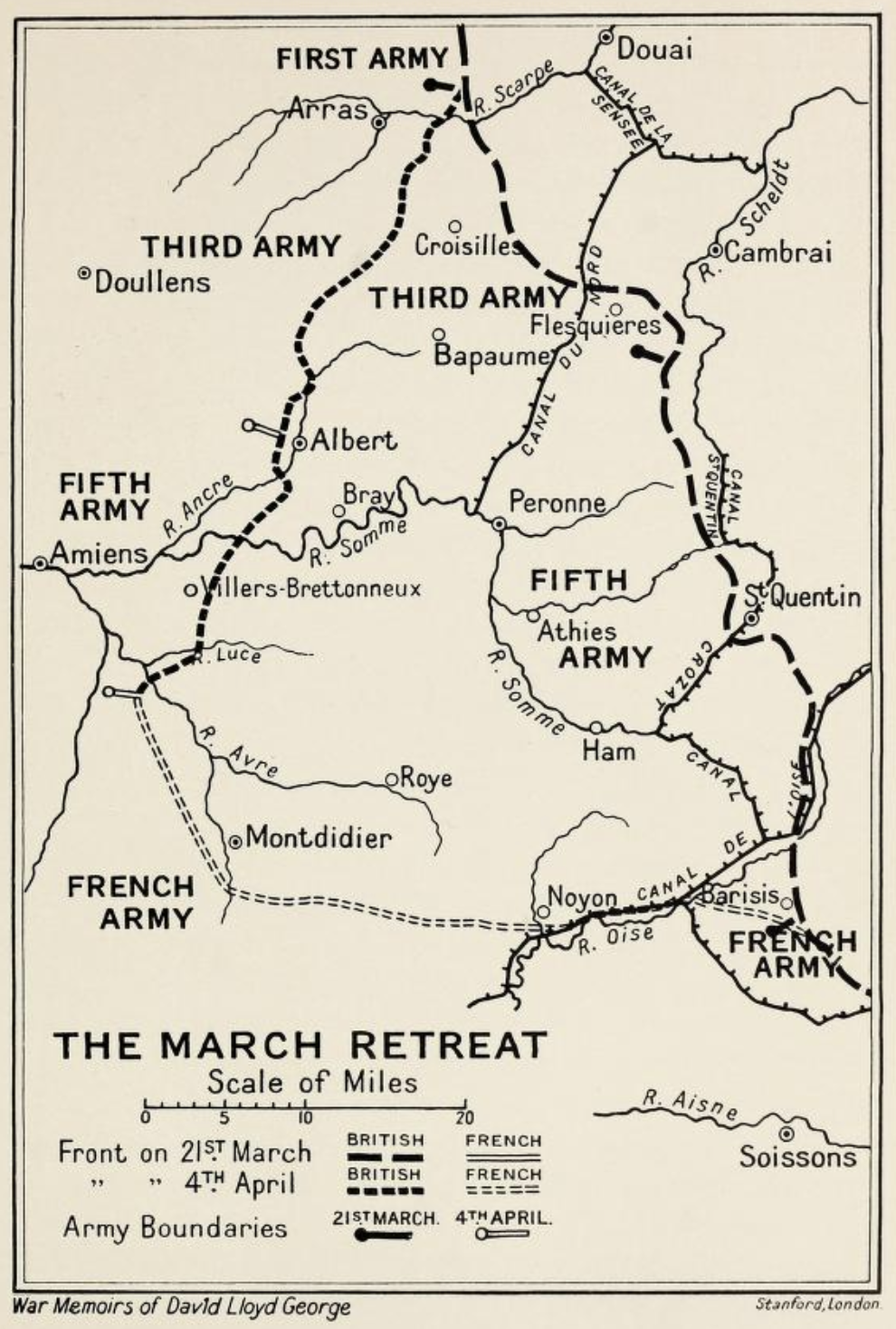
The March Retreat, 1918

The Dury, Compiègne and Abbeville meetings were held by the Allies during World War I to address Operation Michael, a massive German assault on the Western Front on 21 March 1918 which marked the beginning of the Kaiser's Spring Offensive. Since the fall of 1917, a stalemate had existed on the Western Front. However, German victory against Russia in 1917, due to the Russian Revolution and the signing of the Treaty of Brest-Litovsk, freed up German armies on the Eastern Front for use in the west. During the winter of 1917-1918, approximately 50 German divisions in Russia were secretly transported by train to France for use in a massive, final attack to end the war. The battle that followed, Operation Michael, totally surprised the Allies and nearly routed the French and British armies from the field. The meetings below were held under these dire circumstances.

== The Dury Meetings ==
The Dury Meetings (there were 2 of them) occurred on the afternoon of March 23 and evening of March 24, 1918, at Dury Town Hall, located three miles south of Amiens. They were initiated by General Petain, Commander of the French armies on the Western Front, who met with General Douglas Haig, his counterpart in the British Army, at Haig's chateau and advance GHQ. The German attack pierced a part of the line recently taken over by the British from the French (see the top map), and Haig was in desperate need of reinforcements to close the breach. In the area of the break, 26 British divisions faced off against 71 German divisions. He had already been promised 21 divisions from Petain. However, it took two days to transfer a single division by train, without its guns (artillery), so it would take days, even weeks for them all to arrive. At 4 pm on March 23, General Haig needed more help. He asked for a reserve of twenty French divisions to be centered around the town of Amiens (behind the British front), to form a line parallel with the Somme River (see the top map) to protect the British right flank. To this, Petain refused. In fact, the German breach of the Western Front was now deep and growing, and General Petain informed General Haig that if the British continued to retreat, he would have to break his link with them so his French armies could cover Paris. General Petain received his instructions from the French War Cabinet, he informed his generals, and his presence in Dury at 11pm on the night of March 24, 1918 was to inform General Haig. Per author B.H. Liddell-Hart, General Petain warned General Haig:

"If you withdraw your hand in proportion as I'm stretching out mine towards you, contact between our two armies will be broken in the end; your army then risks being cornered in open country, while I shall be reduced to covering Paris."

The order sent by General Petain was less specific, and does not mention Paris. However, per General Weygand, who was the French military liaison to the Supreme War Council in Versailles, General Petain "sent General Fayolle an instruction, the scope of which cannot be exaggerated".

== The Compiègne Meeting ==
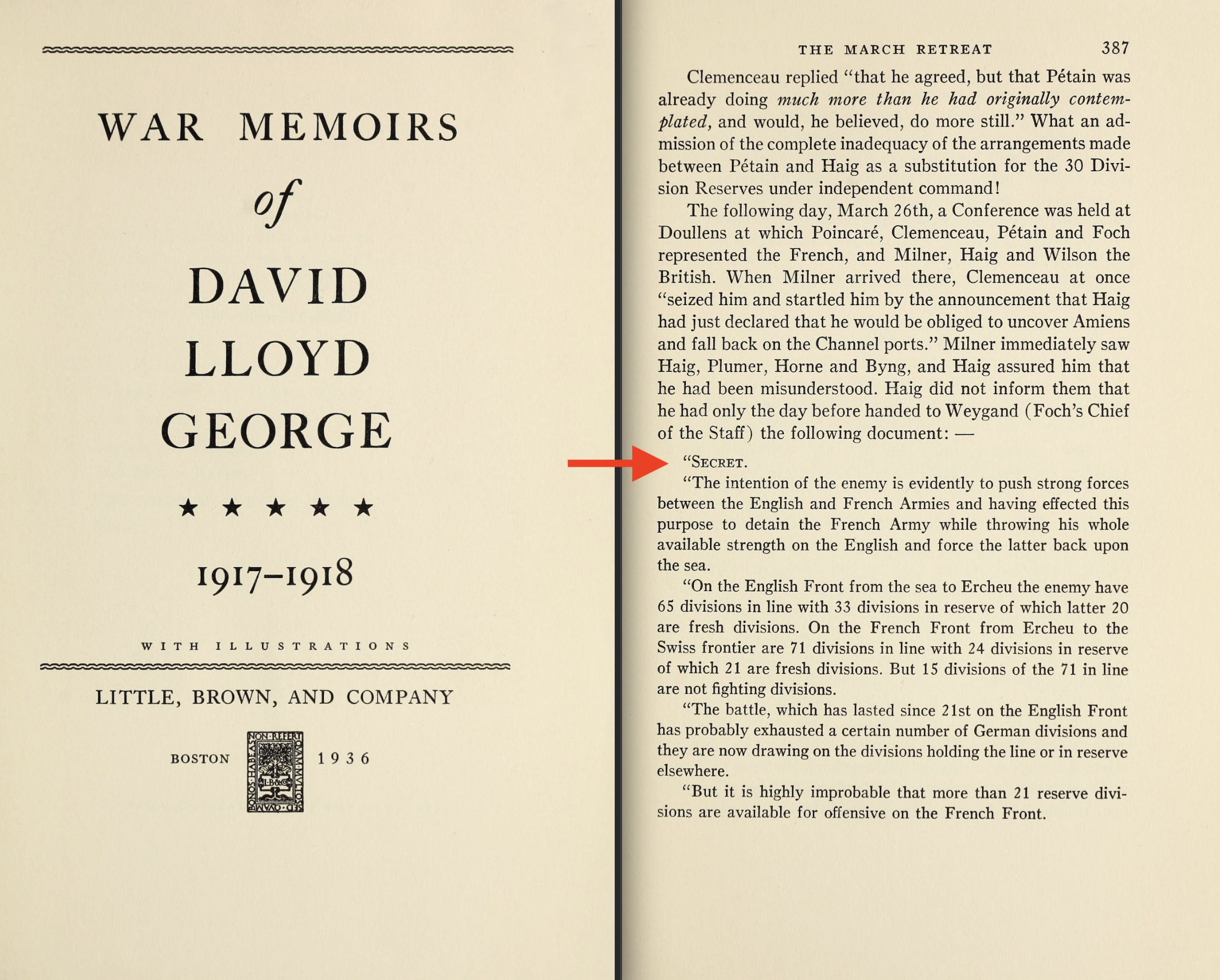
General Haig's retreat order, 1 of 2

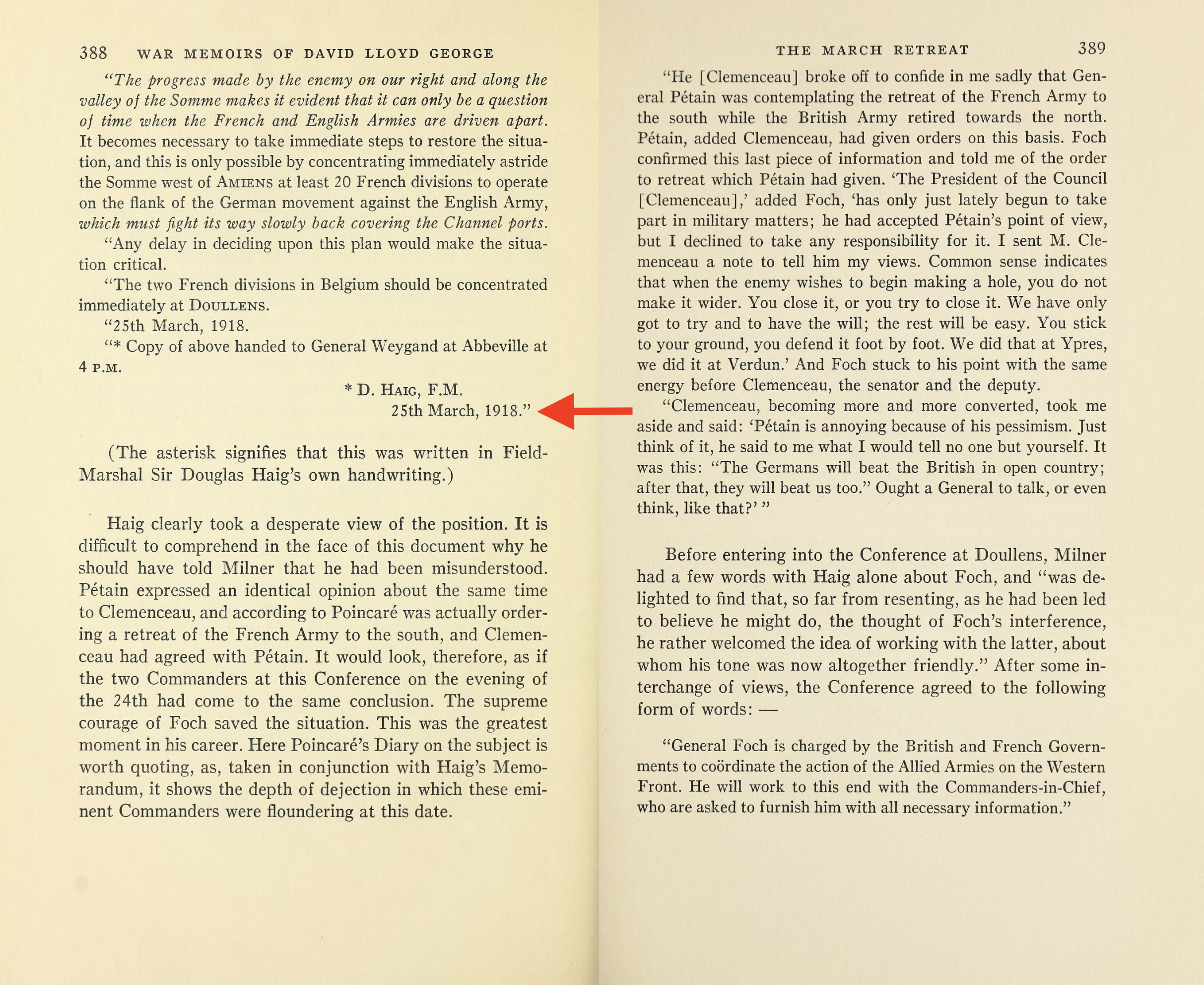
General Haig's retreat order, 2 of 2

The Compiègne Meeting was held at French G.Q.G. Headquarters from 5pm to 7pm in the early evening of March 25. It was arranged by Prime Minister Georges Clemenceau to settle a vexing command problem of the Allies. Unlike the Germans, whose allies were immediately subordinate to the Kaiser and General Ludendorff, Germany's top general, the Allies had no such arrangement, and no unified commander. With all the French generals and their civilian leadership present, but only the British civilian leader present (the British generals were missing), the decision of a unified command had to be postponed until the next day.

== The First Abbeville Meeting ==
This was the meeting attended by the British generals. The Abbeville Meeting was arranged by General Henry Wilson and took place in the afternoon of March 25, 1918 (A second conference, relating to a Supreme War Council meeting, took place on 1-2 May 1918). General Haig had informed his superior, General Henry Wilson, of the initial British defeat (at about 7 P.M., the previous night, over the telephone) and had asked him to come over from England. Haig also invited the French military leadership to a meeting in Abbeville (30 miles south of B.E.F. Headquarters), which was to start at 3pm. When General Wilson arrived from London that morning, he met with General Haig at his headquarters in Montreuil (GHQ) at 11am. He was told that the British were confronted by the whole offensive weight of the German army. General Haig handed Wilson an order, which his headquarters had prepared, that authorized an immediate withdrawal of B.E.F. forces from the trenches in the direction of the Channel ports of Calais, Dunkirk and Boulogne. The order also requested at least 20 divisions from General Petain, to cover the British retreat. Haig said, "Unless the whole French army came up we were beaten" and "It would be better to make peace on any terms we could." General Wilson and General Haig drove to Abbeville early that afternoon. At 4pm they were met by General Maxime Weygand and his aide. Weygand was read the order, and understanding its significance, he asked for a handwritten copy. Although the plan meant abandoning the Western Front line as a defense and leaving a breach open to the Germans, it was the best the Allies could do under the circumstances without avoiding the wider catastrophe of encirclement and surrender. Weygand left the meeting with the order, and that evening hand delivered it to General Mordacq, Prime Minister Clemenceau's military aide. The entire matter was settled the next day, at the Doullens Conference, when all sides finally got together.
