= Hôtel de Ville, Doullens =

Town hall in Doullens, France

Hôtel de Ville
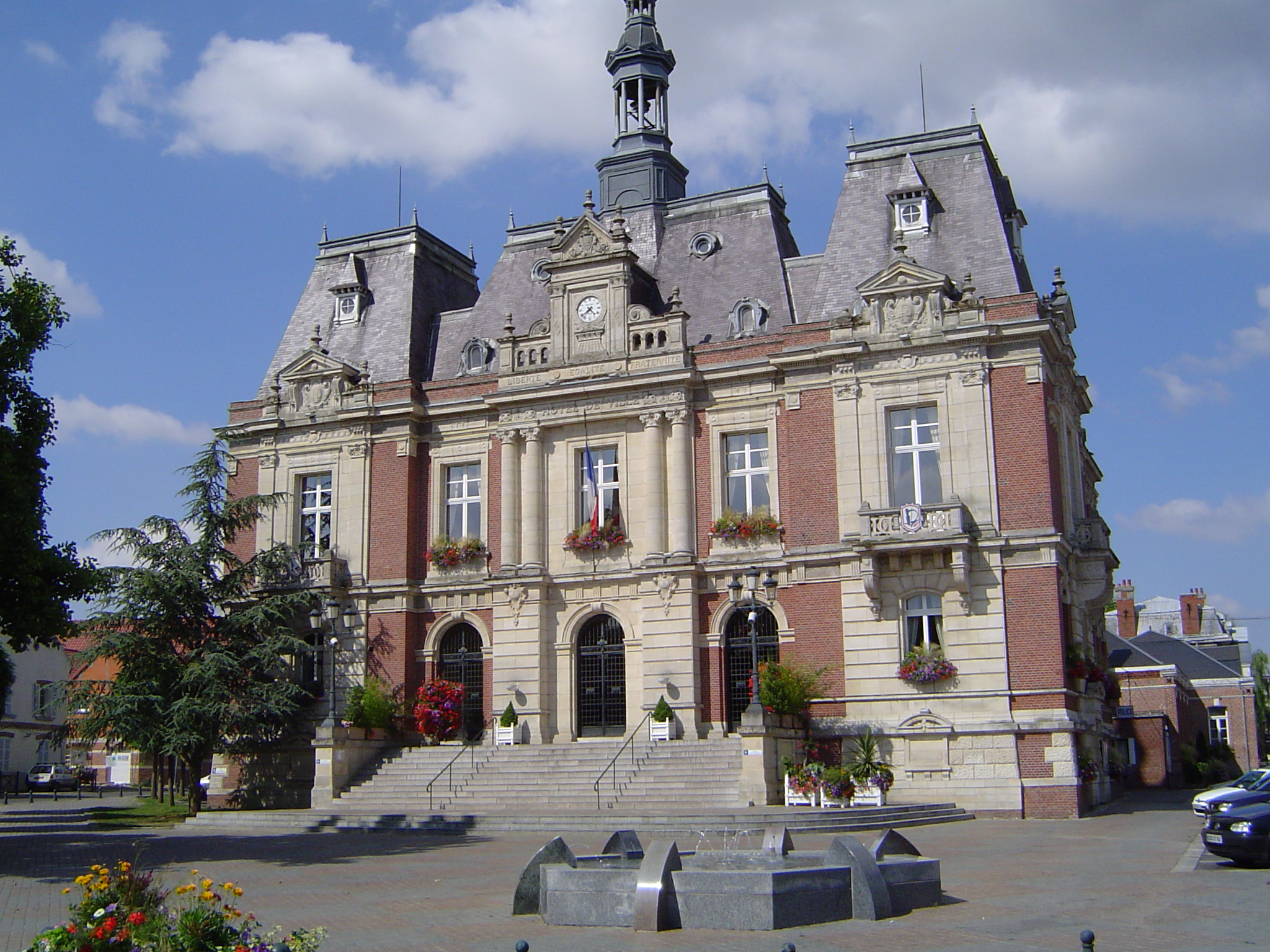
- The main frontage of the Hôtel de Ville in July 2008

General information
- Type: City hall
- Architectural style: Neoclassical style
- Location: Doullens, France
- Coordinates: 50.1574°N 2.3412°E
- Completed: 1898

Design and construction
- Architect: Anatole Bienaimé

Monument historique
- Official name: Salle du Commandement unique en l'hôtel de ville
- Type: Inscrit
- Designated: 1998
- Reference no.: PA80000003

The Hôtel de Ville (French pronunciation: [otɛl də vil], City Hall) is a municipal building in Doullens, Somme, northern France, standing on Avenue du Maréchal Foch. One of the rooms in the building, the Salle du Commandement Unique (the Single Command Room), was designated a monument historique by the French government in 1998.

== History ==
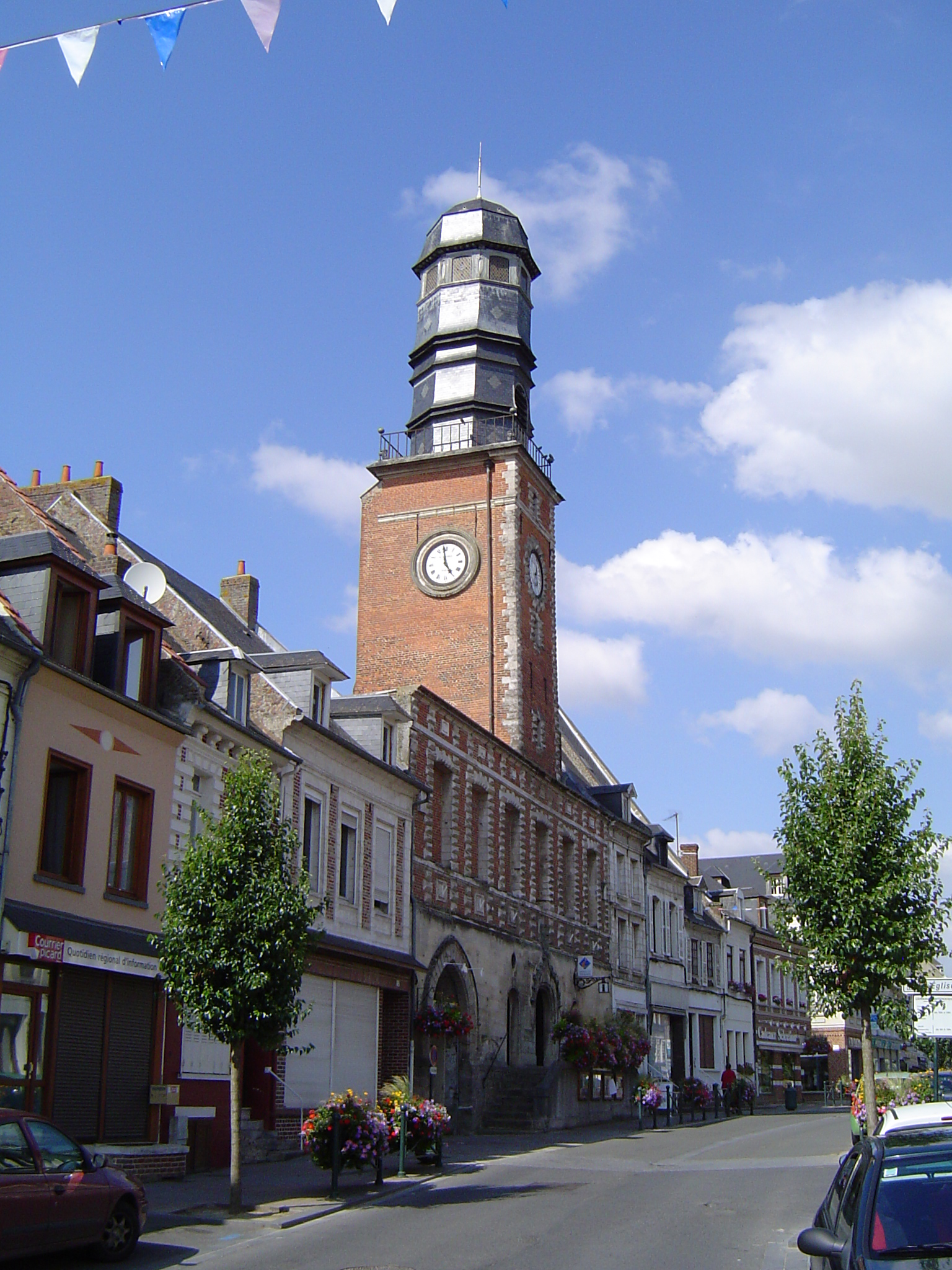
The old town hall and belfry

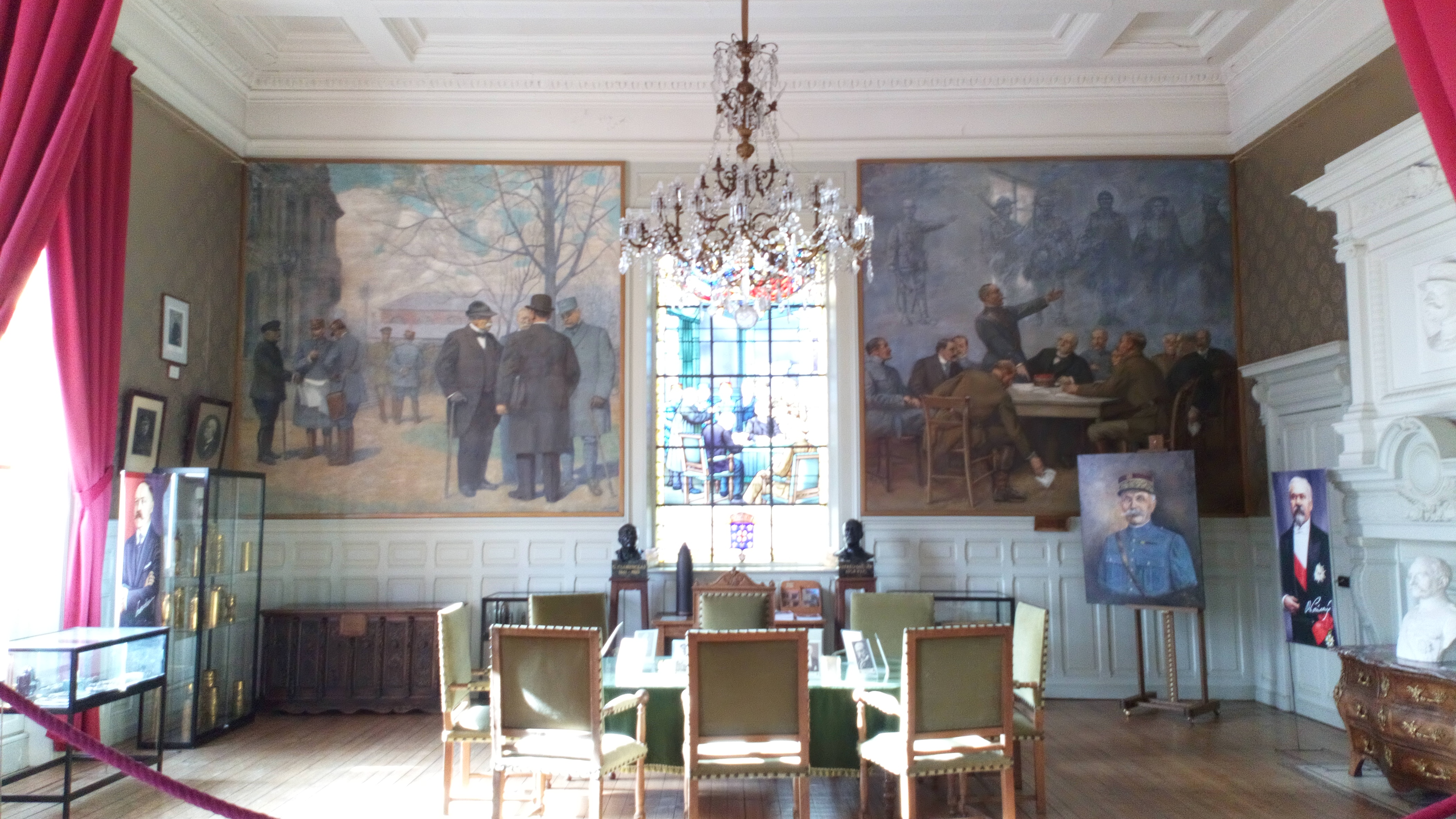
The Salle du Commandement Unique (the Single Command Room)

From the early 17th century, meetings of the aldermen were held in the old town hall and belfry on Rue du Bourg. The old town hall was designed in the medieval style, making extensive use of projecting uncut stone known as bossage, and was completed in 1613. The design involved an asymmetrical main frontage six bays facing onto Rue du Bourg. The ground floor featured a central forestair leading up to a segmental headed doorway, which was flanked by a pair of smaller round-headed doorways. On the left there was an arched carriage entrance with voussoirs. On the first floor there were six window openings, which were later filled with murals depicting events in the history of the town. In the centre of the roof, there was a square clock tower and belfry which was 28 metres (92 ft) high.

In the late 19th century, the town council decided to commission a more substantial structure. The site they selected was occupied by the Benedictine Abbey of Saint-Michel. The abbey, which was established by nuns in the early 12th century, was confiscated by the state and the nuns driven out during the French Revolution.

The foundation stone for the new building was laid by the prefect of the department, André Lauranceau, on 21 April 1896. It was designed by Anatole Bienaimé in the neoclassical style, built in red brick with stone dressings by a local contractor, Wulfran Thuillier, and was officially opened in June 1898.

The design involved a symmetrical main frontage of five bays facing onto what is now Avenue du Maréchal Foch with the end bays projected forward as pavilions and surmounted by mansard roofs. The central bay featured a round-headed doorway with a moulded surround and a keystone flanked by a pair of rusticated pilasters. On the first floor, there was a tall casement window flanked by two pairs of Corinthian order columns supporting a frieze, a cornice and a pediment containing a clock. The bays on either side of the central bay contained round headed doorways on the ground floor and casement windows on the first floor, while the end bays were fenestrated by segmental headed windows on the ground floor and by casement windows with balconies on the first floor. Internally the principal room was the main reception room known as the Salle des Pas Perdus (Room of the Lost Steps).

On 26 March 1918, during the later stages of the First World War, the town hall was the venue for the Doullens Conference. This was a meeting convened between French and British military leaders and governmental representatives. Its purpose was to better co-ordinate their armies' operations on the Western Front in the face of a dramatic advance by the German Army which threatened a breakthrough of their lines. It was convened by Lord Alfred Milner, representing the British Government. The French representatives were the Commander-in-Chief of the French Army, General Philippe Pétain, the French President, Raymond Poincaré, the French Prime Minister, Georges Clemenceau, General Ferdinand Foch, General Maxime Weygand, and the Minister of Munitions, Louis Loucheur. The British representatives were Milner, Field Marshal Sir Douglas Haig, and Generals Henry Wilson, Herbert Lawrence, and Archibald Montgomery. It agreed that Foch should be "charged by the British, French and American governments with coordinating the action of the Allied armies on the Western Front".

The room where the Doullens Conference was held was later transformed into a permanent memorial to the event: the additions included a pair of busts depicting Clemenceau and Milner created by the sculptor, François-Léon Sicard, in 1918, a stained glass window, designed by Gérard Ansart and made by Jean Gaudin, in 1937, and two murals painted by Lucien Jonas in 1938.

Following the liberation of the town on 1 September 1944, during the Second World War, pigeons and white balloons were released from the town hall to celebrate the event.
