= Doullens =

Doullens Dourlins (Picard)
- Commune
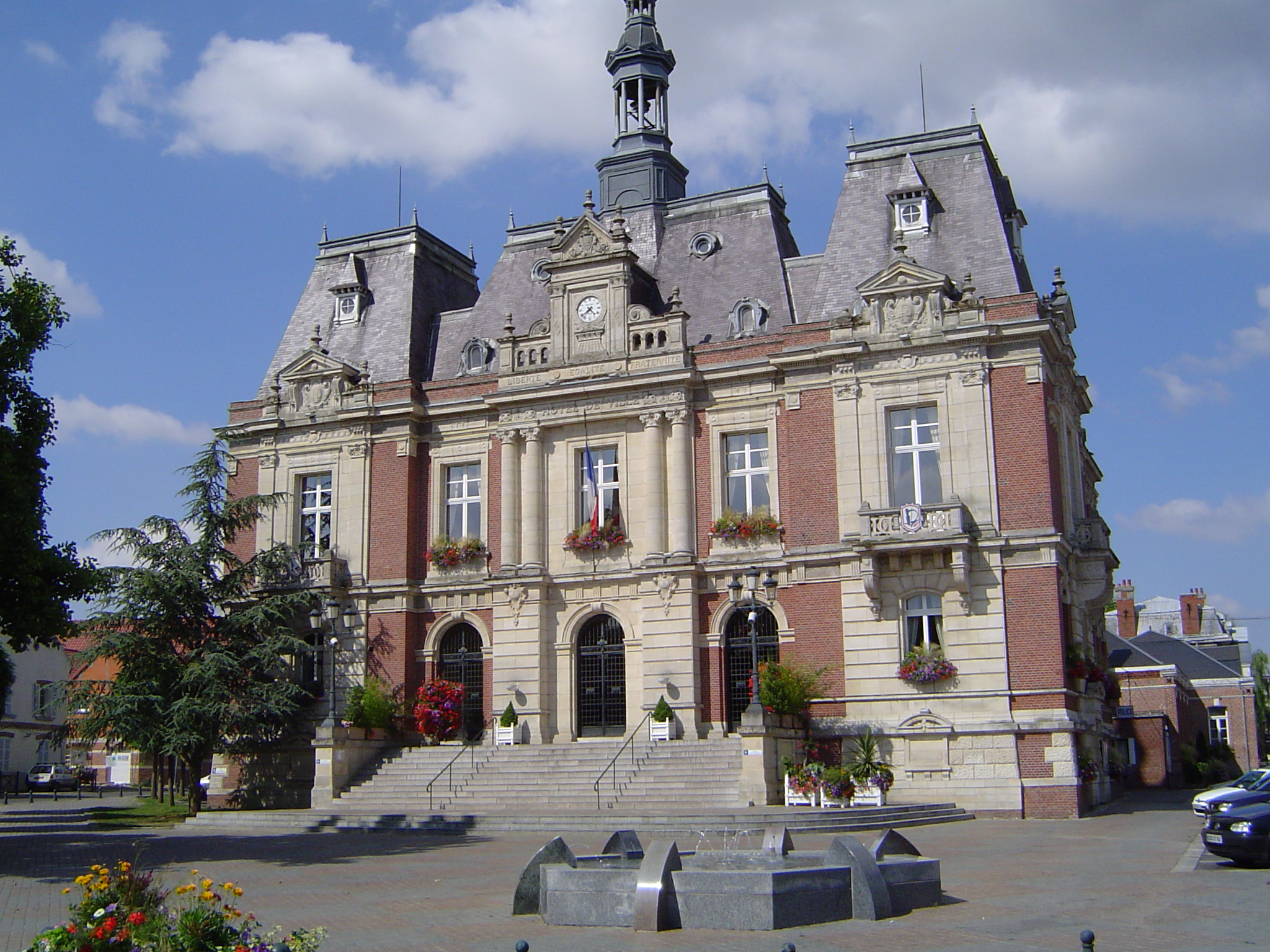
- The Hôtel de Ville (town hall)

- Coat of arms
- Location of Doullens
- Location within France Location within Hauts-de-France
- Coordinates: 50°09′27″N 2°20′29″E
- Country: France
- Region: Hauts-de-France
- Department: Somme
- Arrondissement: Amiens
- Canton: Doullens
- Intercommunality: CC Territoire Nord Picardie

Government
  - Mayor (2025–2026): Claude Maquet
- Area^{1}: 33.4 km^{2} (12.9 sq mi)
- Elevation: 64 m (210 ft)
- Highest elevation: 152 m (499 ft)
- Lowest elevation: 52 m (171 ft)
- Population (2023): 5,751
  - Density: 172/km^{2} (446/sq mi)
- Time zone: UTC+01:00 (CET)
  - Summer (DST): UTC+02:00 (CEST)
- INSEE/Postal code: 80253 /80600
- ^{1} French Land Register data, which excludes lakes, ponds, glaciers > 1 km^{2} (0.386 sq mi or 247 acres) and river estuaries.

Doullens (French pronunciation: [dulɑ̃]; Picard: Dourlin; former Dutch: Dorland) is a commune in the Somme department, Hauts-de-France, France.

Its inhabitants are called Doullennais and Doullennaises.

== Geography ==
Doullens is situated on the N25 road, in the northern part of the department, straddling the river Authie, the border with the Pas-de-Calais. Doullens is practically mid-way on the intersection of these axes :

- Abbeville - Arras
- Amiens - Saint-Pol-sur-Ternoise
- Crécy-en-Ponthieu - Bapaume
- Auxi-le-Château - Acheux-en-Amiénois

== History ==
- Doullens, the ancient Dulincum, was seat of a viscountship under the counts of Vermandois then of Ponthieu and an important stronghold in the Middle Ages.
- In 1225, the town became part of France.
- In 1475 it was burnt by Louis XI for openly siding with the Duke of Burgundy. It received its name Doullens-le-Hardi from its gallant defense in 1523 against the Anglo-Burgundian army.
- In 1595 it was besieged and occupied by the Spaniards, who massacred the entire population. It was restored to France by the Peace of Vervins (1598).
- On 26 March 1918, orders giving General Foch overall command of the allied forces on the western front were signed at the Doullens Conference in the Hôtel de Ville (town hall). The orders were subsequently published in The Times of London.

== Sites and monuments ==
Sites and monuments include:

- the ruins of Saint-Pierre, partly of the 13th century, used as a barn in the nineteenth century.
- Notre-Dame church.
- An early 17th century brick belfry. In 2005, the belfry was inscribed on the UNESCO World Heritage List as part of the Belfries of Belgium and France site, because of its architecture and historical testimony to the rise of municipal power in the area.
- the citadel, possibly built by Vauban or Jean Errard, which has often served as a state prison, and later, a reformatory for girls.

== Town motto ==
Infinita decus lilia mihi prestant

== Population ==
Historical population

Year	Pop.	±% p.a.
1936	5,770	—
1946	5,404	−0.65%
1954	6,169	+1.67%
1962	6,321	+0.30%
1968	7,119	+2.00%
1975	7,495	+0.74%
1982	7,054	−0.86%

Year	Pop.	±% p.a.
1990	6,615	−0.80%
1999	6,279	−0.58%
2007	6,339	+0.12%
2012	6,643	+0.94%
2017	6,106	−1.67%
2023	5,751	−0.99%

Source: EHESS and INSEE (1968-2023)

== Notable residents ==
- The artist Édouard Traviès was born in Doullens in 1809.
- Louis Auguste, Duke of Maine was imprisoned in the Doullens citadel from 1718 until 1720 for his part in the Cellamare conspiracy.
- The nobleman Emmanuel Marie Michel Philippe Fréteau de Saint-Just was imprisoned in the citadel in 1788.

== Gallery ==
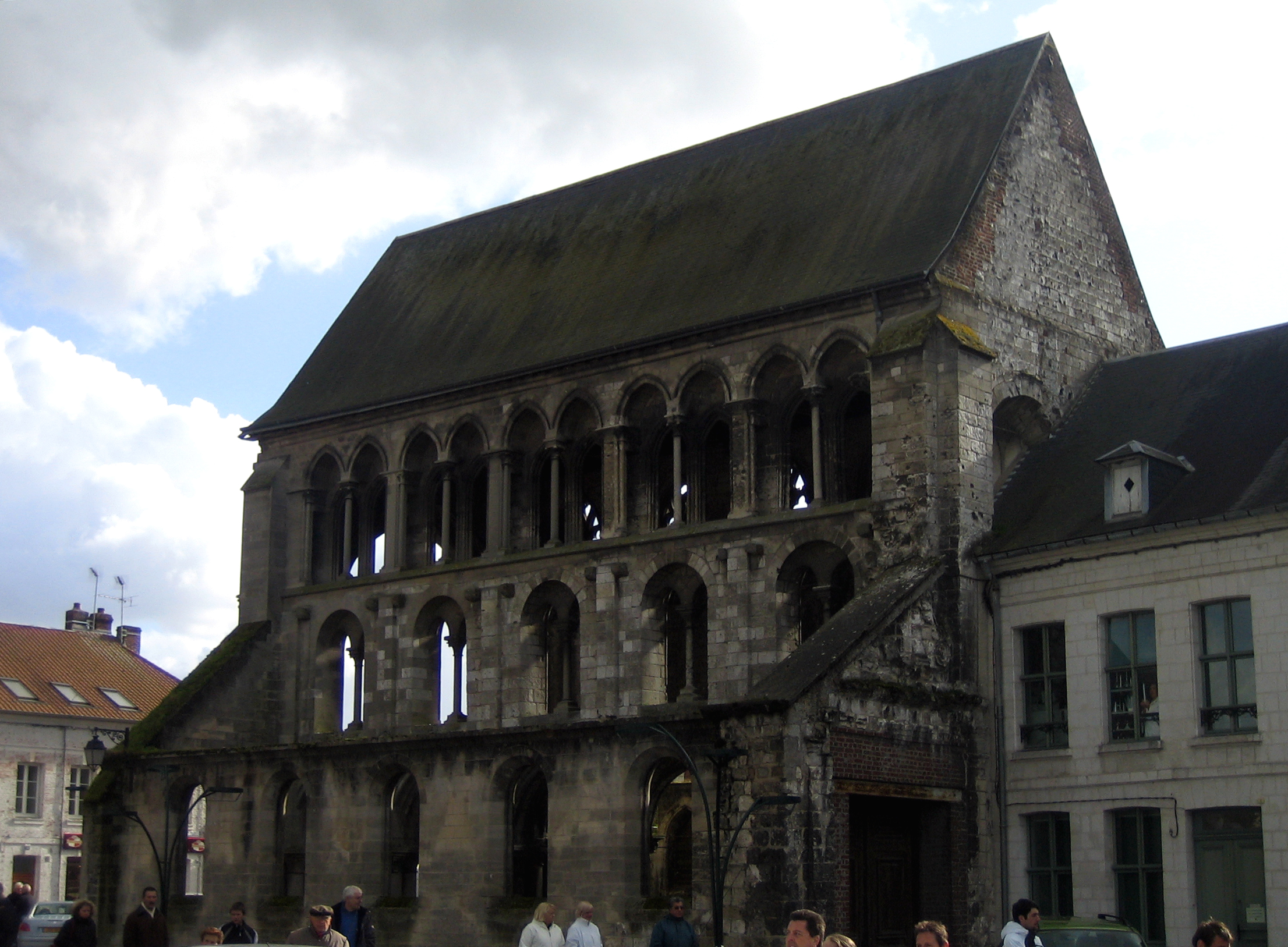
Church of St-Pierre

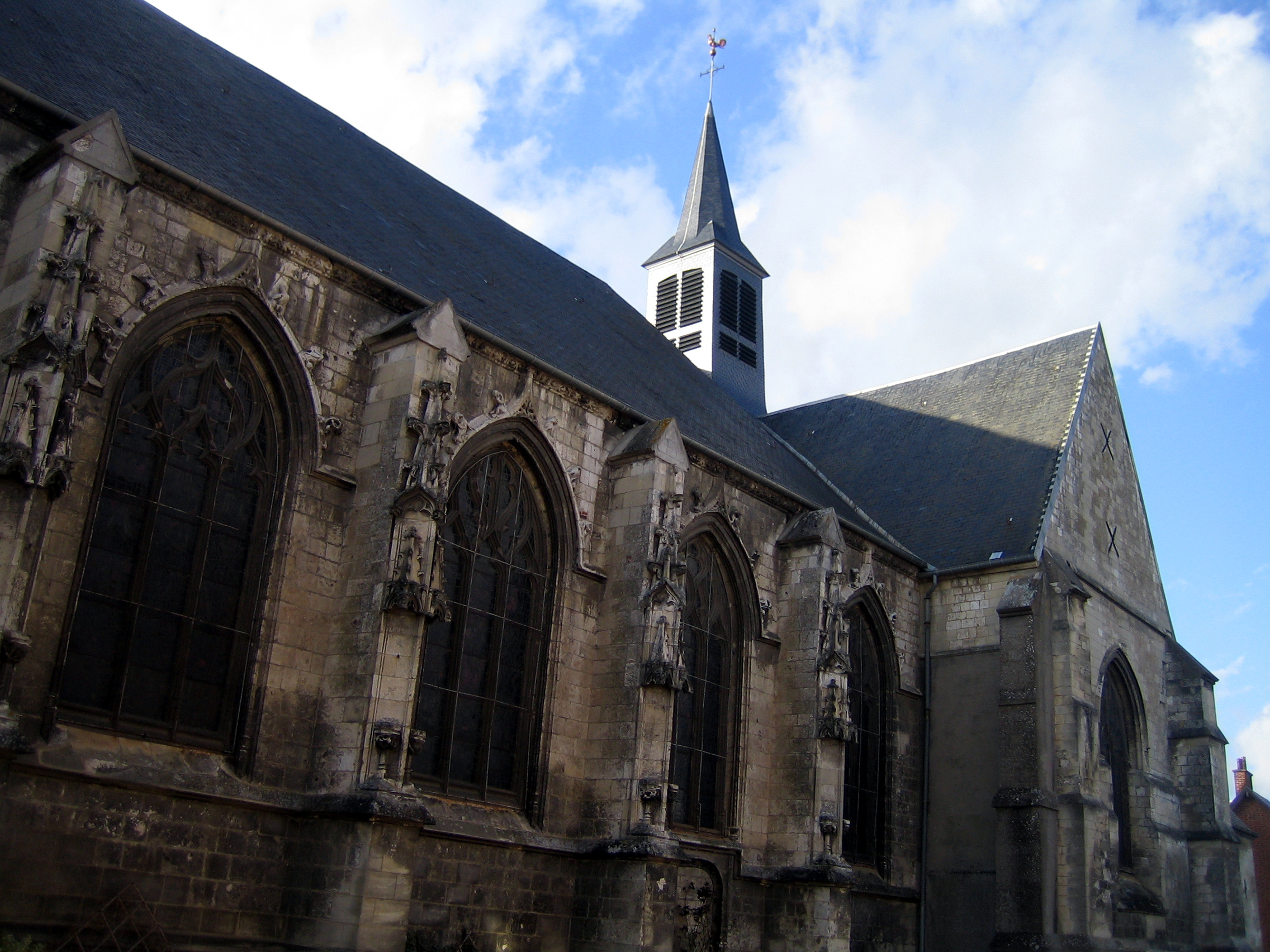
Notre-Dame church

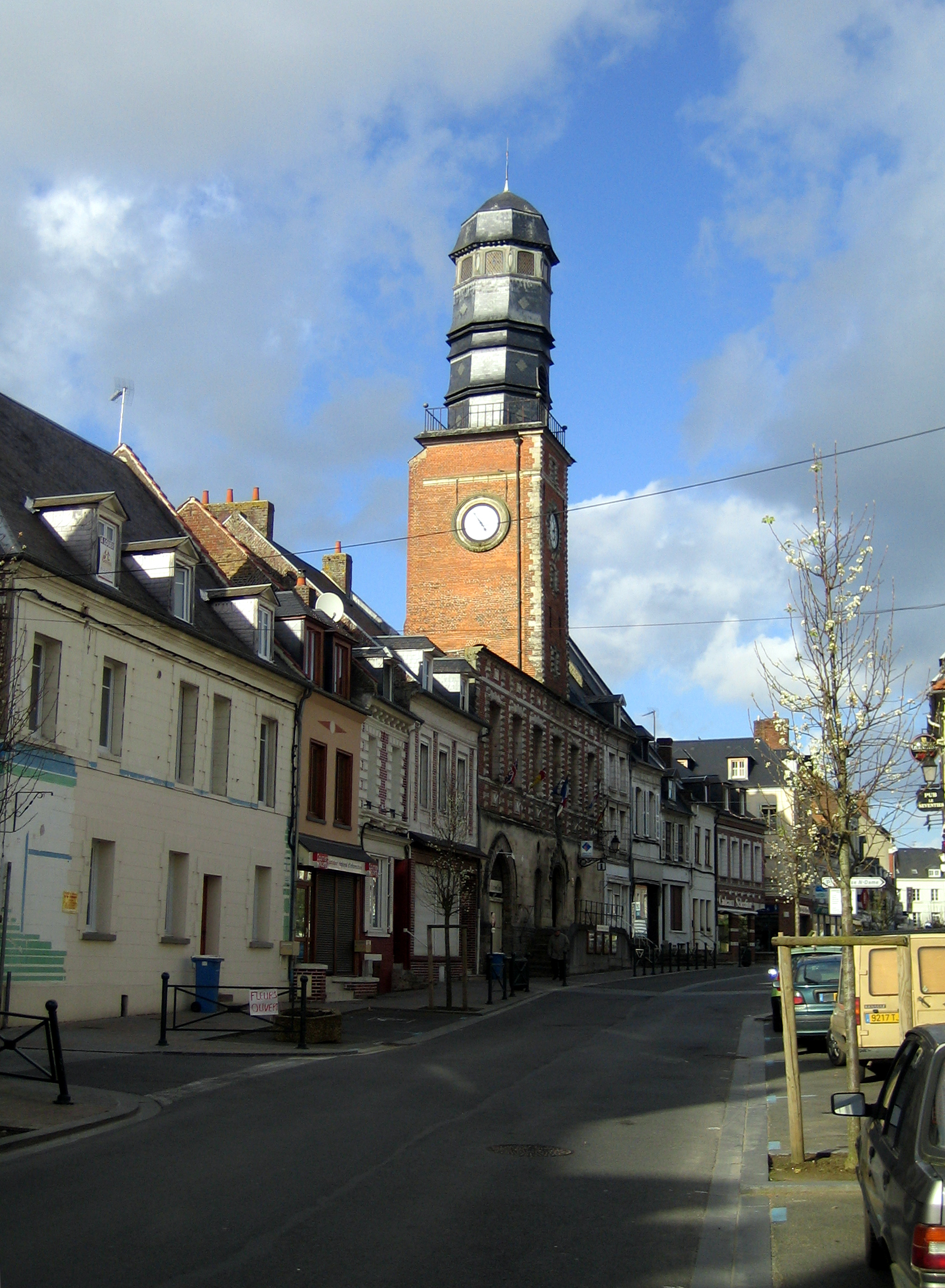
Belfry and Tourist office

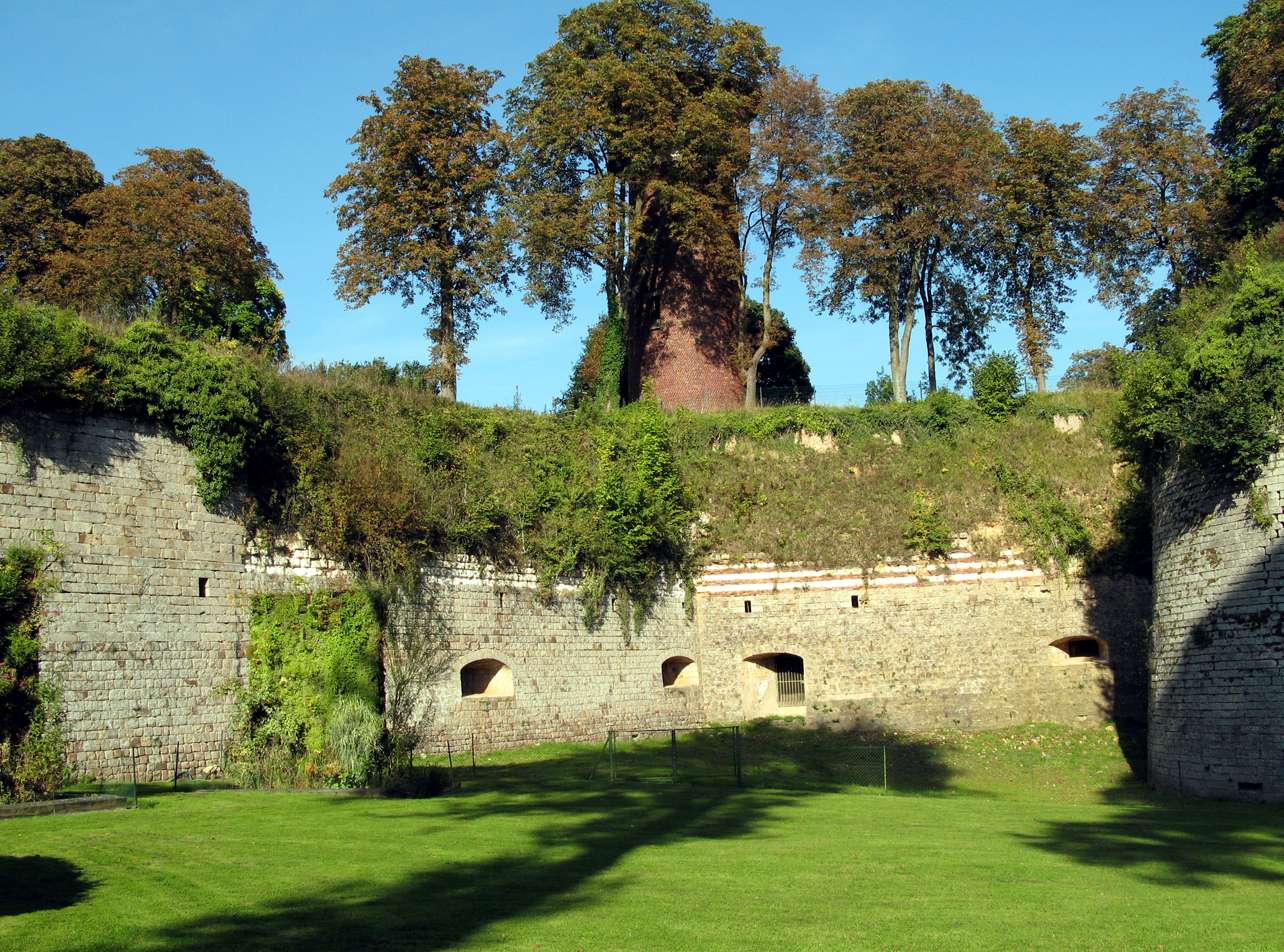
Interior of the Citadelle

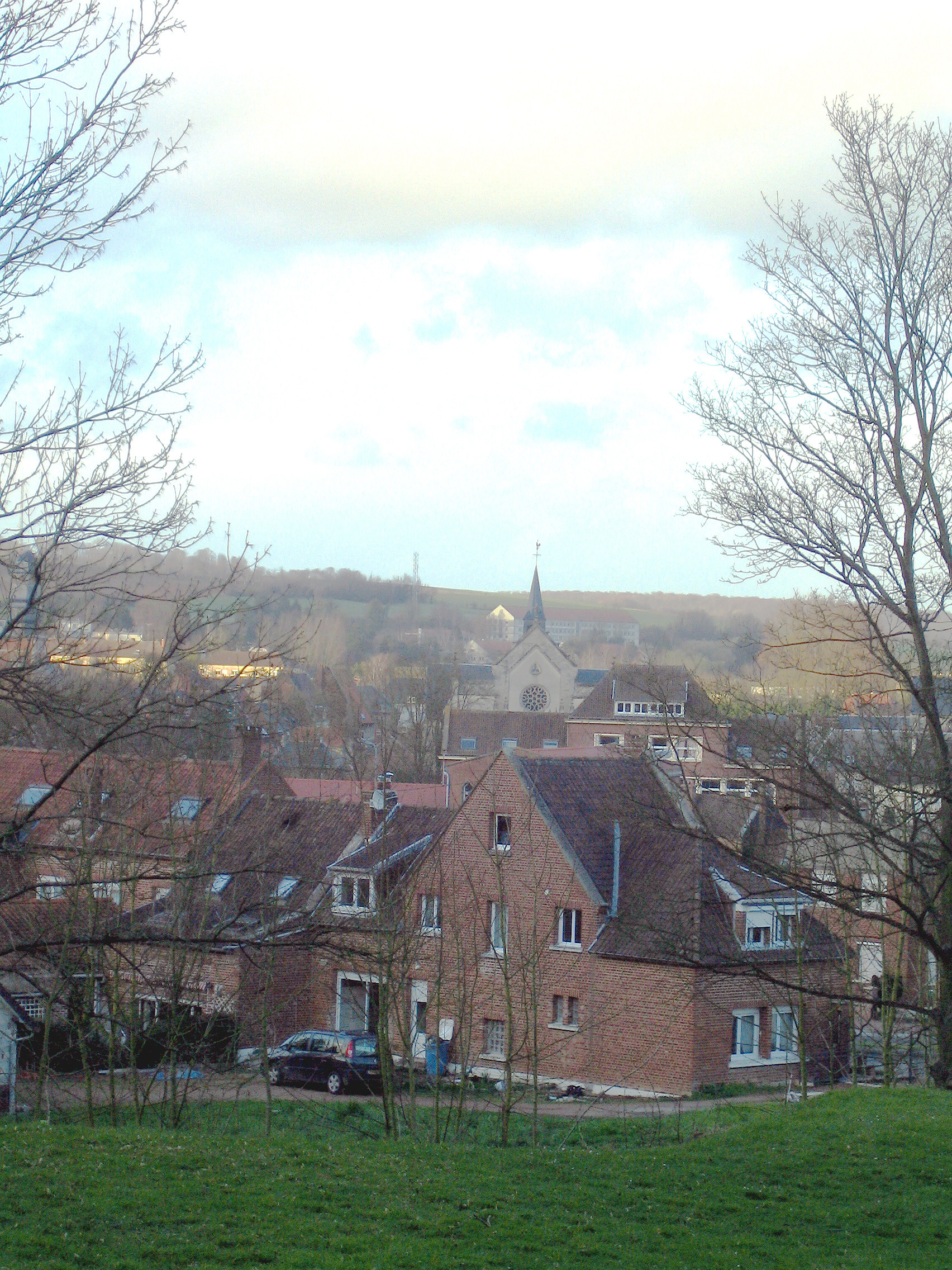
Notre-Dame church seen from the Citadelle

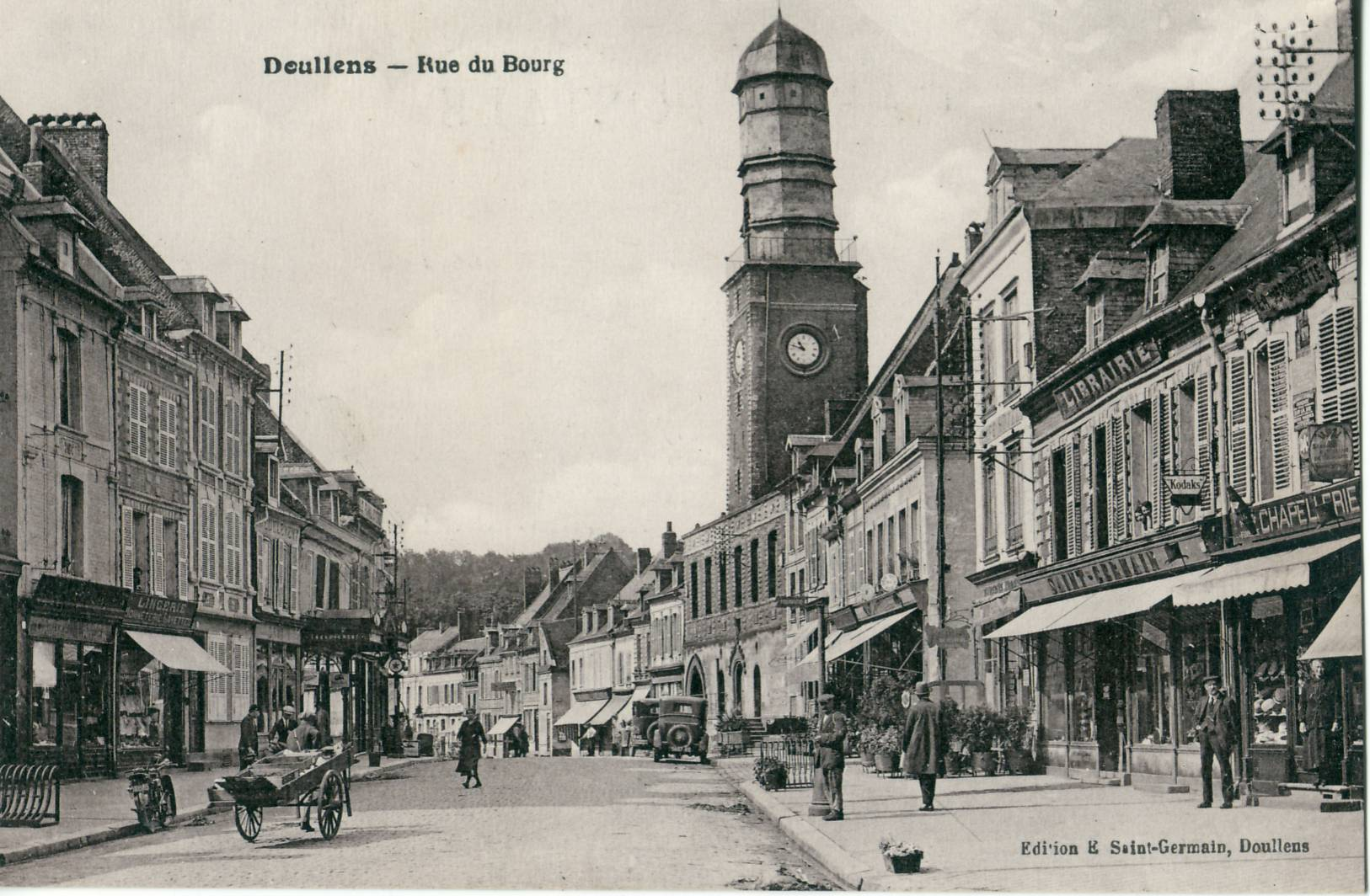
Doullens belfry, in the 19th century

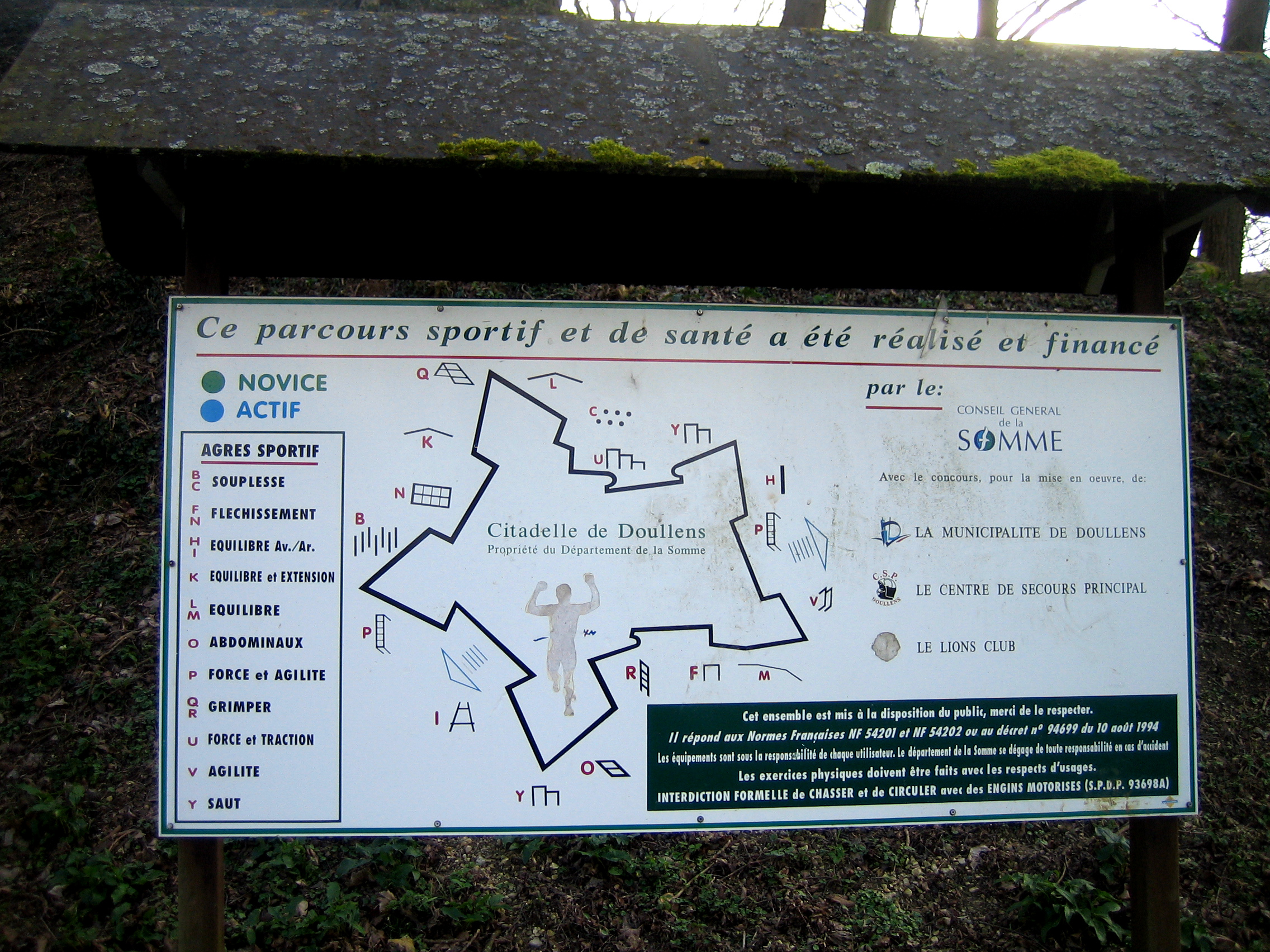
Information placard of the Citadelle

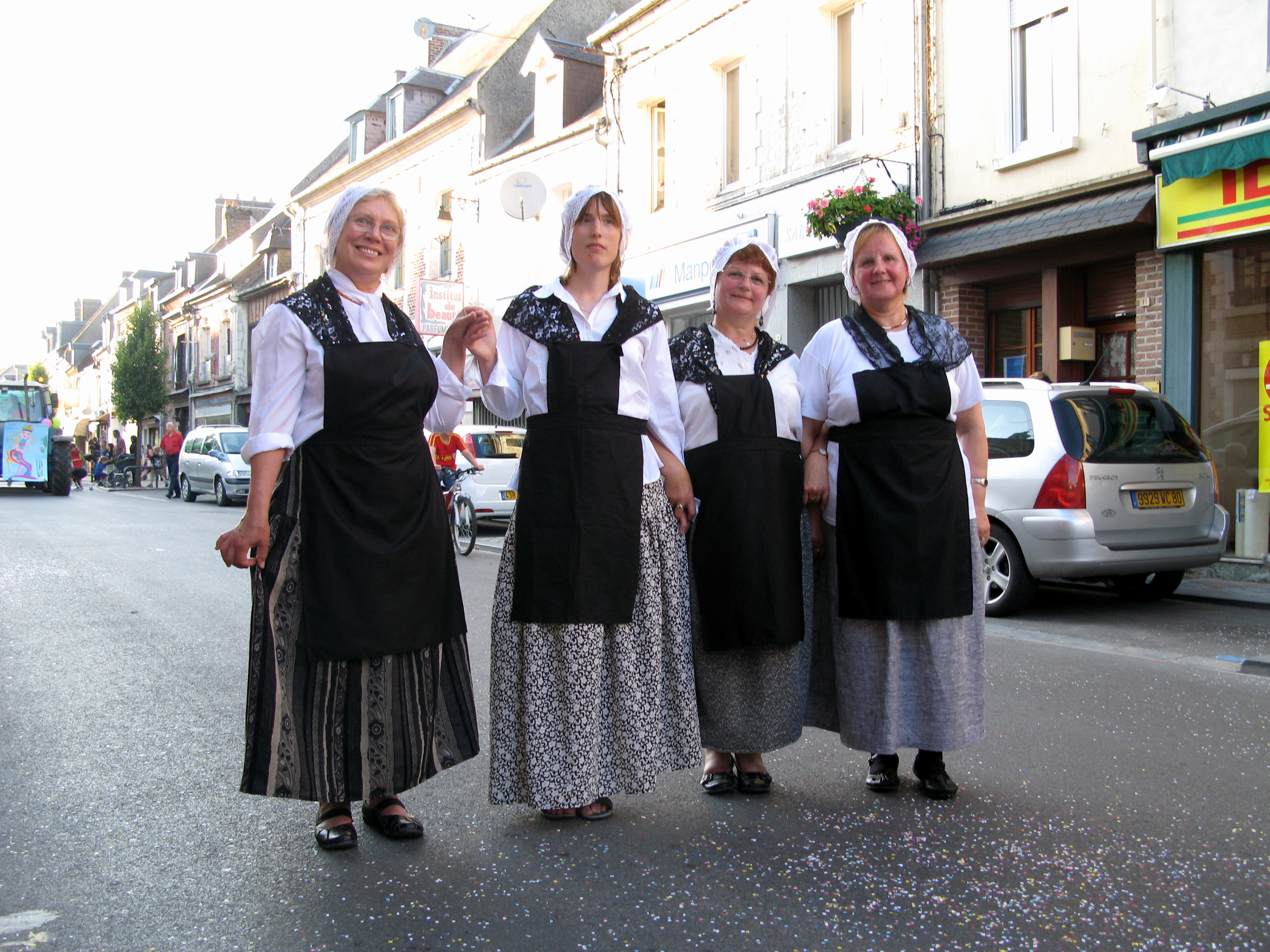
Summer Carnival in Doullens (2009)

== See also ==
- Communes of the Somme department

== Sources ==
- Hare, August (1896). North-eastern France. Macmillan.
