= Imperial War Cabinet =

British war cabinet

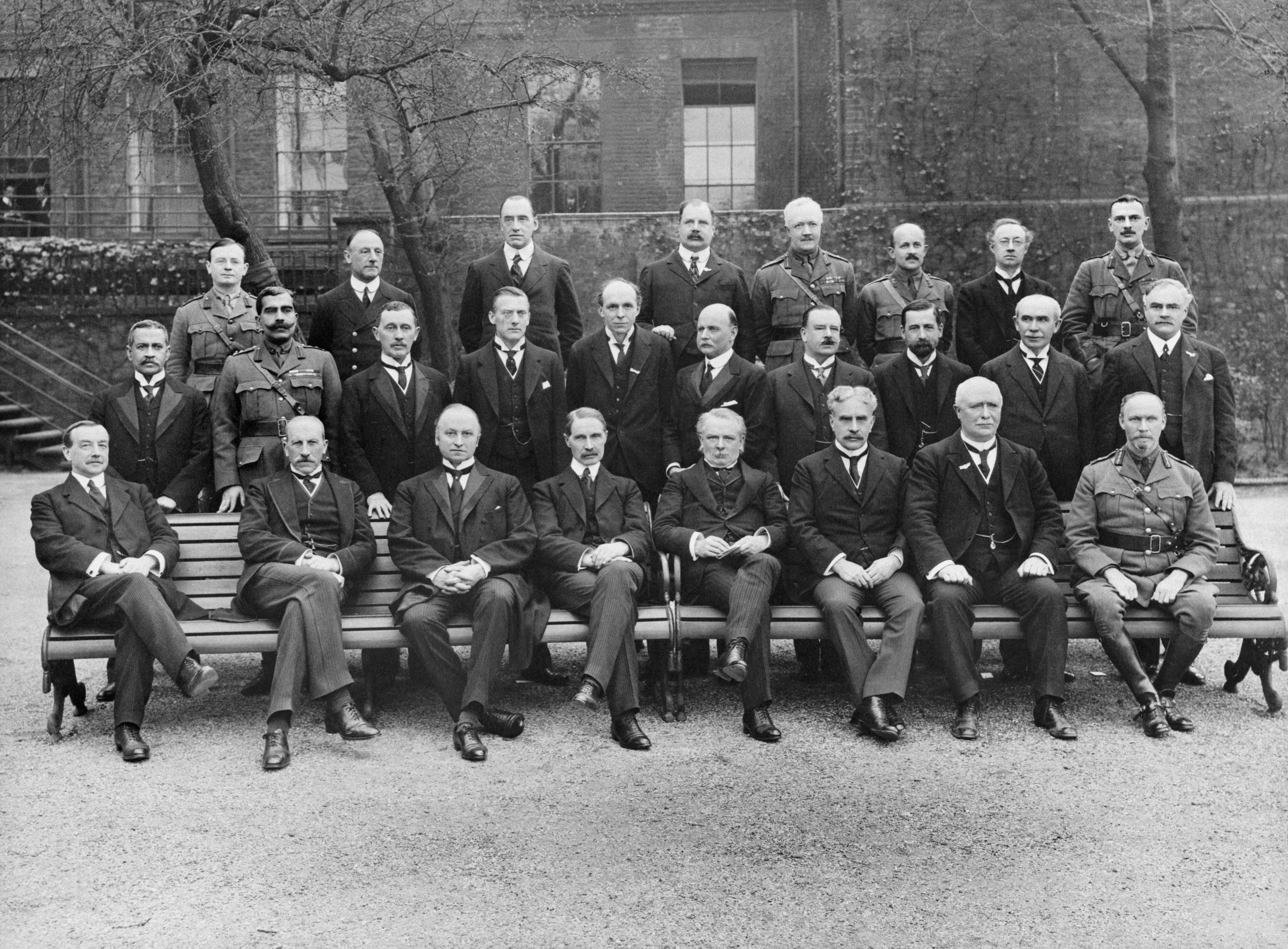
The Imperial War Cabinet in 1917

The Imperial War Cabinet (IWC) was the British Empire's wartime coordinating body. It met over three sessions, the first from 20 March to 2 May 1917, the second from 11 June to late July 1918, and the third from 20 or 25 November 1918 to early January 1919. Consisting of representatives from Canada, Australia, India, the Dominion of Newfoundland, New Zealand, South Africa, and the United Kingdom, the Cabinet considered many aspects of waging the First World War. It led to the United Kingdom's Dominions being considered more equal to Great Britain and Ireland. Held concurrently with the cabinet were the Imperial War Conferences of 1917 and 1918.

== Background ==
In 1887, the First Colonial Conference was held. It was organised at the behest of the Imperial Federation League in hopes of creating closer ties between the colonies and the United Kingdom. It was attended by more than 100 delegates, mostly unofficial observers, from both self-governing and dependent colonies. India, however, was not represented. Further Colonial Conferences (later Imperial Conferences) were held in 1894, 1897, 1902, 1907, and 1911. The British Empire was ill prepared upon the outbreak of World War I for land warfare, consisting of a small professional force with 247,432 regular troops. David Lloyd George was named Minister of Munitions in 1915 and played a large role helping wage the war. He became Prime Minister of the United Kingdom on 7 December 1916. The purpose of the Imperial War Cabinet was to bring Britain's important Dominions and India up to the same status as the mother country to discuss war strategy, and to further the cause of Imperial Federation.

== Meetings ==
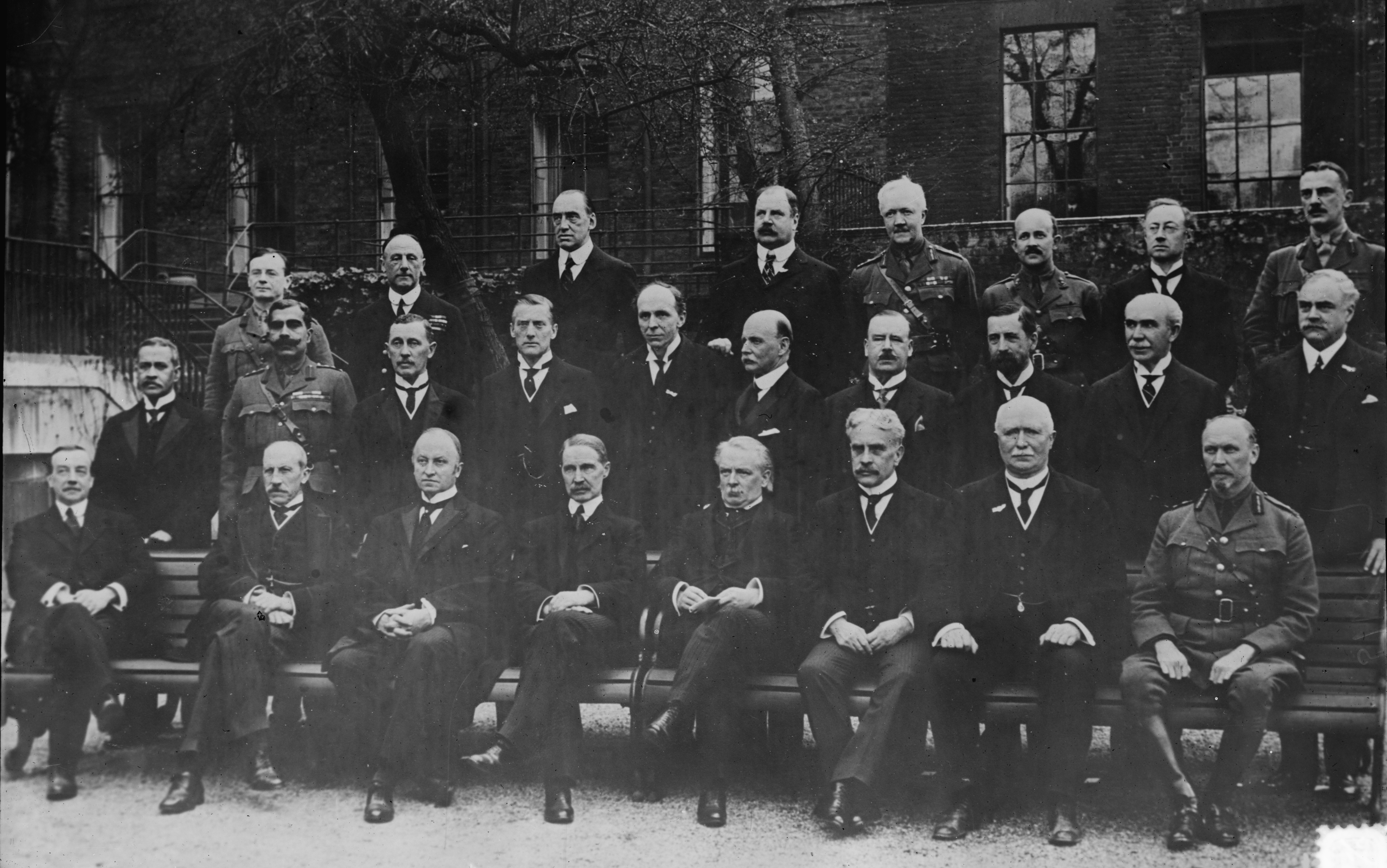
Imperial War Cabinet, offset picture

On 14 December 1916, Lloyd George cabled all countries in the British Empire, informing them that "Your Prime Minister will be a member of the War Cabinet." Jan Smuts arrived on 12 March 1917, to large crowds. Robert Borden secretly departed and arrived in February 1917, and all of the involved Prime Ministers were present by 20 March 1917 (with the exception of Billy Hughes of Australia), and the first meeting of the Imperial War Cabinet was held. Lloyd George said that formation of the cabinet marked "the beginning of a new epoch in the history of the Empire," and The Times wrote the following day:

The new world is to redress the balance of the old .... The great European problems which fall to be settled by the verdict of war . . are henceforth problems for Canada and New Zealand and the other Dominions as well as Great Britain .... The War Cabinet which is now meeting is an executive cabinet for the Empire [sic]. It is invested with full responsibility for the prosecution of the war, including questions of Foreign Policy, of the provisioning of troops and munitions and of war finance. It will settle Imperial policy as to the time of peace.

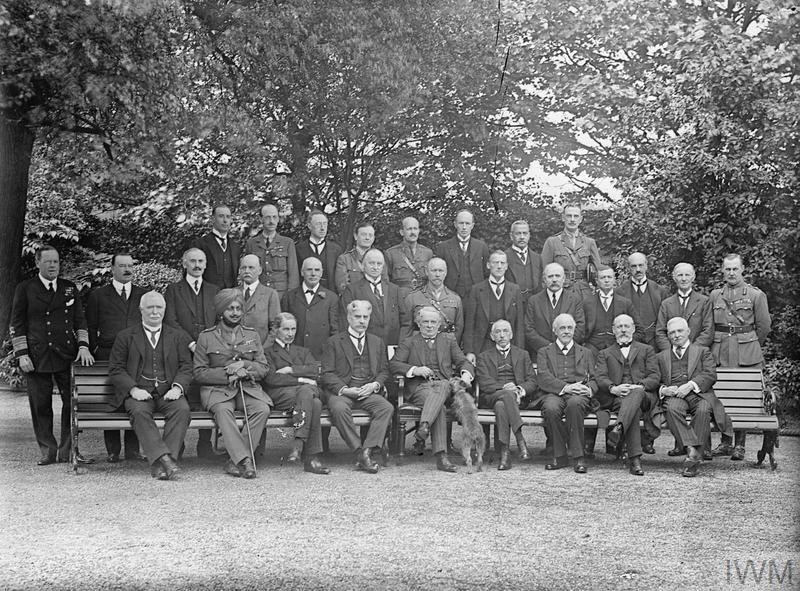
The Imperial War Cabinet in 1918

Though led by the British Prime Minister primus inter pares (and in his absence the Prime Minister of Canada), the countries involved were largely treated as equals. Between 20 March and 2 May 1917, the cabinet had 14 meetings, with involved prime ministers splitting their time between the cabinet and the concurrently running Imperial War Conferences. Proceedings of the cabinet were secret, but it is thought that "much of the energy of the War Cabinet was devoted to the grave question of increasing the number of troops available." The British War Cabinet continued to make most strategic decisions. Smuts attended the meetings of the British War Cabinet after the disbanding of the IWC.

The Imperial War Cabinet met again on 11 June 1918, with a gathering in the Royal Gallery on 21 June marking the arrival of thirteen current and former Prime Ministers. The Cabinet engaged in many policy decisions, including asking Canada to send troops to Siberia, and travelling to a meeting of the Supreme War Council on 4 or 5 July and later on 3 December. The IWC decided that Prime Ministers of the Dominions had a right to communicate directly with the British Prime Minister. After six weeks, the cabinet disbanded in late July 1918. A "minister of cabinet rank" from all represented Dominions remained in London for the duration of the war.

On 27 October, the IWC was called together to help discuss the peace settlement, and on 20 or 25 November the cabinet began its third session (though without representatives from New Zealand and India, and South African representatives didn't arrive until 16 December). It considered the terms of the Armistice of 11 November 1918 and on 3 December the cabinet heard French Marshal Ferdinand Foch and French Prime Minister Georges Clemenceau. Through the rest of December, the IWC would confer with Italian Prime Minister Vittorio Emanuele Orlando, Italian Foreign Minister Sidney Sonnino, and US President Woodrow Wilson. In January 1919, the cabinet's operations were largely transferred to France as the British Empire delegation.

== Participants ==
| Nation | Name | Portfolio | Ref(s) |
|---|---|---|---|
| United Kingdom | David Lloyd George | Prime Minister (1917 – 1918) | |
| United Kingdom | Lord Curzon | Leader of the House of Lords | |
| United Kingdom | Bonar Law | Chancellor of the Exchequer and Leader of the House of Commons | |
| United Kingdom | Walter Long | Secretary of State for the Colonies | |
| Canada | John Douglas Hazen | Minister of Fisheries, Oceans, and the Canadian Coast Guard (1917) | (Note: Was not a member of the War Cabinet proper, served in an accompanying and assisting role) |
| Canada | Robert Rogers | Minister of Public Works (1917) | (Note: Was not a member of the War Cabinet proper, served in an accompanying and assisting role) |
| Canada | Robert Borden | Prime Minister of Canada (1917 – 1918) | |
| Canada | George Perley | Minister of Overseas Military Forces (1917) | |
| Canada | Arthur Meighen | Minister of the Interior (1918) | |
| Canada | James Calder | Minister of Immigration (1918) | |
| Canada | Newton Rowell | President of the Privy Council (1918) | |
| South Africa | Jan Smuts | Minister of Defence (1917 – 1918) | |
| South Africa | Henry Burton | Minister of Railways (1918) | |
| Australia | Billy Hughes | Prime Minister of Australia (1917 – 1918) | |
| Australia | Joseph Cook | Minister of the Navy (1918) | |
| New Zealand | William Massey | Prime Minister of New Zealand (1917 – 1918) | |
| New Zealand | Joseph Ward | Deputy Prime Minister of New Zealand (1917 – 1918) | |
| (Dominion of Newfoundland) Newfoundland | Edward Morris | Prime Minister of Newfoundland (1917) | |
| (Dominion of Newfoundland) Newfoundland | William F. Lloyd | Prime Minister of Newfoundland (1918) | |
| (British Raj) India | Austen Chamberlain | Secretary of State for India (1917) | |
| (British Raj) India | Edwin Montagu | Secretary of State for India (1918) | |
| (British Raj) India | James Meston | Lieutenant-Governor of the United Provinces of Agra and Oudh (1917) | |
| (British Raj) India | Ganga Singh | Maharaja of Bikaner (1917) | |
| (British Raj) India | Satyendra Prasanna Sinha | Member of the Executive Council of the Governor of Bengal (1918) | |
| (British Raj) India | Bhupinder Singh | Maharaja of Patiala (1918) | |

== See also ==
- Committee of Imperial Defence
- Commonwealth Heads of Government Meeting
- Lloyd George ministry

== Footnotes ==
Notes
