= 1930 Imperial Conference =

Conference between nations in the Commonwealth

- Host country: United Kingdom
- Date: 1 October 1930– 14 November 1930
- Cities: London
- Venues: 10 Downing Street and Foreign Office
- Heads of State or Government: 8
- Chair: Ramsay MacDonald (Prime Minister)
- Follows: 1926
- Precedes: 1932

Key points

The 1930 Imperial Conference was the sixth Imperial Conference bringing together the prime ministers of the dominions of the British Empire. It was held in London. The conference was notable for producing the Statute of Westminster, which established legislative equality for the self-governing Dominions of the British Empire with Great Britain, thereby marking the effective legislative independence of these countries. Economic relations within the British Empire was also a key topic with proposals for a system of Imperial preference - empire-wide trade barriers against foreign (i.e. non-empire) goods. These proposals were further discussed at the British Empire Economic Conference in 1932.

== Background ==
The 1926 Imperial Conference produced the Balfour Declaration that Dominions were autonomous and not subordinate to Great Britain. The 1929 Conference on Dominion Legislation and Merchant Shipping Laws was intended to move from the Balfour Declaration's broad statement of principle to a substantive legal framework, but the Irish Free State and the Union of South Africa demanded greater practical autonomy than the other attendees would allow. The 1930 Conference would instead address the issue.

Historian George Woodcock argues it marks the beginning of the end of the British Empire.

== The Conference ==
The conference was hosted by King-Emperor George V, with his Prime Ministers and members of their respective cabinets:

Nation	Name	Portfolio
United Kingdom	Ramsay MacDonald	Prime Minister (chairman)
Australia	James Scullin	Prime Minister
Canada	R. B. Bennett	Prime Minister
(British Raj) India	William Wedgwood Benn	Secretary of State
Irish Free State	W. T. Cosgrave	President
(Dominion of Newfoundland) Newfoundland	Richard Squires	Prime Minister
New Zealand	George Forbes	Prime Minister
South Africa	J. B. M. Hertzog	Prime Minister
