= Imperial Federation =

Proposed unification of the British Empire

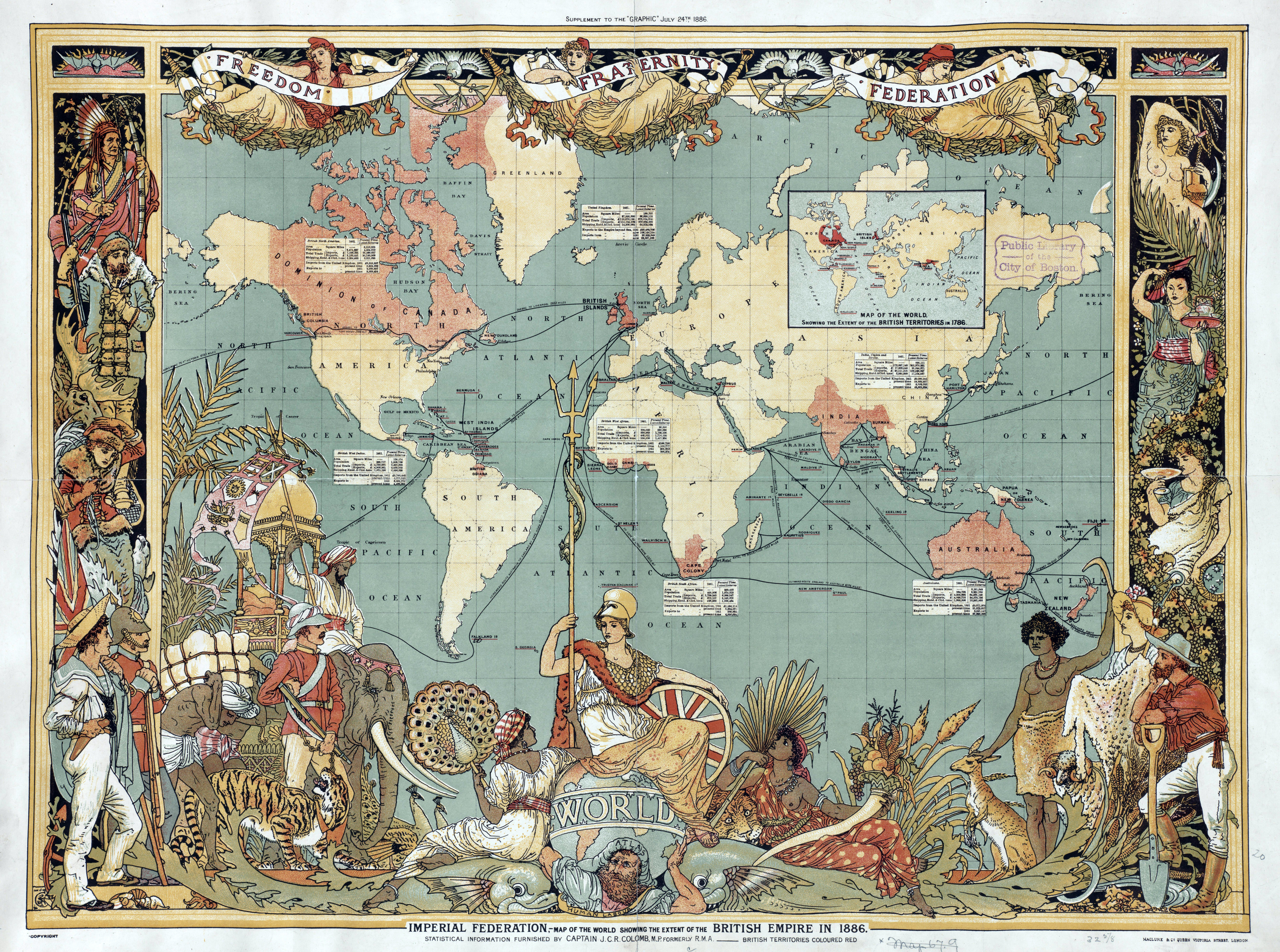
Map showing the British Empire in 1886 (before expansion in Africa)

The Imperial Federation were a series of proposals in the late 19th and early 20th centuries to create a federal superstate to replace the existing British Empire, presenting it as an alternative to colonial imperialism. No such proposals were ever adopted, but various schemes were popular in Australia, Canada, New Zealand, and other colonial territories. The project was championed by Unionists such as Joseph Chamberlain as an alternative to William Gladstone's proposals for home rule in Ireland.

Many proposals were put forward, but none commanded majority support. The major advancing group, Imperial Federation League, the main advocacy group, split into two factions in 1893, with one group promoting imperial defence and the other encouraging imperial trade. Various proposals were put forward, with most of them calling for a single state with an imperial parliament headquartered in London. Such proposals were never put into effect, and decolonisation would eventually happen to a vast majority of Britain's colonies beginning from the mid 20th century.

The new parliament was envisioned to cooperatively deal with internal trade, foreign relations, defence, and other issues that affected the entire federation. The new parliament would have representatives from India that would rule the latter directly, while the dominions such as Australia, Canada, New Zealand, Newfoundland, and South Africa as well as crown colonies such as Cyprus, Gibraltar, Malta, and Singapore would have internal self-government, although still accountable to this new parliament in London, similar to devolution that was granted to Northern Ireland, Scotland, and Wales during the late 20th century. In the Imperial Federation, Ireland would also have self-government, which was expected to reduce demand for independence in Ireland.

== Motivations ==
By the 1880s the British Empire covered a quarter of the world's land area, and included a fifth of the world's population. There was no doubt about the vastness of the potential, and there was agreement that opportunities were largely wasted because politically and constitutionally there was no unity, no common policies, no agreed central direction, no "permanent binding force" said Alfred Milner. Associations were formed and discussions were held to come up with a solution.

The British Empire consisted of many colonies, several of which were largely self-governing dominions (Canada, Newfoundland, Australia, New Zealand, South Africa, and the Straits Settlements). Most were ruled by colonial officials including India, the West Indies, and Fiji. The future of the empire remained uncertain, as it was unclear what the result would be if all colonies eventually became self-governing. Among other concerns, it would be very difficult for British interests to be maintained if every colony was essentially already sovereign.

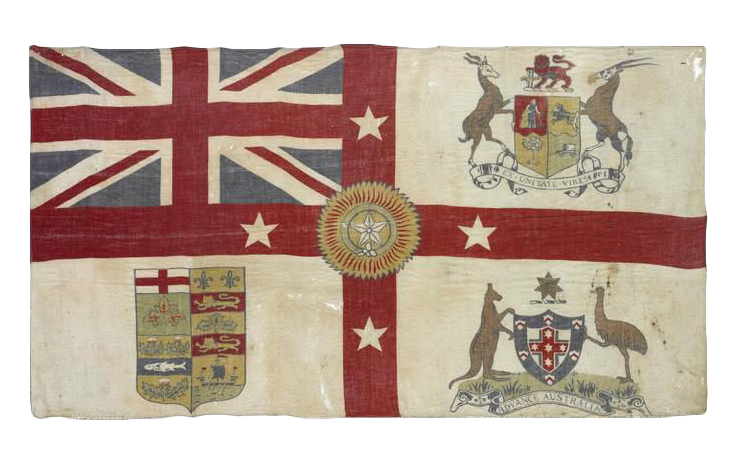
The original 1910 design of the British Empire flag (above) and a digital recreation of it (below). The flag was made to promote unity by recognising the symbols of the dominions.

New national identities emerging throughout the dominions was also a cause for concern. Growing autonomy for Canada, Australia, New Zealand, and South Africa led to each of them adopting coats of arms of their own rather than continuing to use those of the United Kingdom. Some felt that the growing status of the dominions was not reflected in British symbols such as the Union Jack, and this led to calls for the creation of unifying symbols such as a British Empire flag to represent a new multinational reality.

Creating an Imperial Federation thus became a popular alternative proposal to colonial imperialism. The plan was never firm, but the general proposal was to create a single federal state among all colonies of the British Empire. The federation would have a common parliament and would be governed as a superstate. Thus, Imperial unity could be maintained while still allowing for democratic government. The colonies would increase their influence while Britain would be able to share the costs of imperial defence. The best features of large states could be combined with the best features of small states. It was seen as a method of solving the Home Rule problem in Ireland, as England, Scotland, Wales, and Ireland (along with the other members of the Old Commonwealth) would have their own Parliaments. Westminster would become a purely Imperial body.

Supporters of the Imperial Federation regarded the United Kingdom as having two possible futures: imperial union of its colonies consisting of different ethnic groups and continued long-term importance in global affairs, or imperial dissolution and the reduction of the status of the country to a second-class nation with little to no power projection. In response to claims that geography was against federation on such a large scale, it was said that scientific advancements would solve the difficulty. Edward Ellis Morris reminded listeners to his lecture in 1885 that it was now as easy to reach London from Melbourne or Singapore as it had been to reach London from Orkney at the time of the Acts of Union 1707, or to reach Washington, D.C. from San Francisco before 1869.

Albert Venn Dicey in 1897 proposed an Anglo-Saxon "intercitizenship" during an address to the Fellows of All Souls at Oxford.

== Organisation ==
The Imperial Federation League was founded in London in 1884 and subsequent branches were established in Canada, Australia, New Zealand, Barbados, and British Guiana. While the proposal was often associated with segments of the British Conservative Party, it was also popular among Liberal Imperialists (proponents of New Imperialism) such as William Edward Forster. Several members of the Imperial Federation League were motivated by ethnonationalism, drawing inspiration from the writing of theorists such as Sir Charles Dilke and John Robert Seeley to call for a "Greater Britain" which would also encompass the predominantly white self-governing colonies and dominions. The League could not agree on its primary role of focusing on either defence or trade, and was dissolved in 1893.

Canadian advocates of imperial federation were termed "Canadian Imperialists" and their ideology was "Canadian Imperialism" in Canadian historiography since Carl Berger's 1970 book The Sense of Power identified this as a separate ideology from Canadian nationalism. Noted Canadian Imperialists included George Monro Grant, Sir George Robert Parkin, Stephen Leacock, Sir Sam Hughes, and George Taylor Denison III.

In 1900, Thomas Hedderwick, a Scottish Liberal Party MP, raised the issue in the British House of Commons. Recalling to the House the contributions of Dadabhai Naoroji and Mancherjee Bhownagree, Indian MPs serving in the House of Commons, Hedderwick mooted the possibility that an autonomous India might one day be represented in an Imperial Parliament.

== Obstacles ==
One of the main obstacles to the scheme was what one of its proponents, Richard Jebb, called colonial nationalism. The granting of authority to a super-parliament composed of many competing interests was seen by opponents as a compromise to the powers of the local parliaments. Leading colonial supporters of imperial federation, such as Australian prime minister Alfred Deakin and Canadian Minister of Militia and Defence Sir Sam Hughes, however saw the movement as a way to increase the influence of the dominions over imperial defence and foreign policy. The colonial branches of the Imperial Federation League in fact outlived the demise of the home branch in London, which collapsed in 1896 when it failed to resolve internal disputes over imperial trade policy.

While Joseph Chamberlain, Secretary of State for the Colonies from 1895 to 1903, was sympathetic to the idea, his proposals for a permanent Imperial Council or Council of the Empire which would be a kind of Imperial Parliament passing policies that would bind colonial governments, was rejected at the 1897 Colonial Conference and 1902 Colonial Conferences due to fears that such a scheme would undermine the autonomy of colonies. Similarly, proposals for centralising the Empire's armed forces were also rejected as were his proposals for an Empire customs union. At subsequent Imperial Conferences, proposals for Imperial preferential trade were rejected by the British Liberal governments due to their preference for international free trade. It would not be until the British Empire Economic Conference in 1932 that Imperial Preference would be implemented; however, the policy did not survive World War II.

== Decline ==
Support for imperial federation waned with World War I which produced greater feelings of national identity in several dominions, Canada and Australia in particular. Defence concerns and problems of imperial cooperation were partially resolved through the system of Colonial or Imperial Conferences and with growing sentiments by various dominion governments for greater independence resulting in the Balfour Declaration of 1926 and the Statute of Westminster 1931. It was last discussed seriously at the governmental level at the 1937 Imperial Conference where it was dismissed.

The idea of Imperial unity was carried on after World War I by Lionel Curtis and the Round Table movement, which continues to this day as a forum and promoter of the Commonwealth of Nations and also by the Royal Commonwealth Society which continues to promote the Commonwealth.

In recent years, following the United Kingdom's decision to leave the European Union, many of the concepts behind the Imperial Federation have found a new life within the CANZUK movement. Critics sceptical of the CANZUK movement make the argument that "distance and the size of trading partners matter more than historical links in determining trading relationships between countries". Conversely, advocates argue that technological advances now make it possible to fly from the United Kingdom to Australia in under 24 hours, seriously overcoming the limitation of distance which hampered the idea a century ago. They remark that internet and the ability to instant message/call the other side of the world has greatly increased the connectivity between these four countries. In August 2018 the Canadian Conservative Party proposed a CANZUK treaty which aims to achieve free trade in goods and services, visa-free travel arrangements, reciprocal healthcare, increased consumer choice, increased travel protection, and security co-ordination between the four countries. The CANZUK treaty has some political support in the minor political parties of other CANZUK countries, with the New Zealand ACT Party, the British Unionist Party, and the UK Libertarian Party all explicitly stating their support for CANZUK. The Australian Liberal Democrats have not referenced CANZUK directly but have stated support for policies which align with the aims of CANZUK.

== See also ==
- Commonwealth free trade
- CANZUK
- External association
- Federalism
- Political union
- Round Table movement
- Supranational union
