= Imperial Economic Conference =

Imperial Economic Conference may refer to:

- 1923 Imperial Conference of British Empire prime ministers held in London
- The British Empire Economic Conference of prime ministers held in Ottawa in 1932
