= 1923 Imperial Conference =

Conference on the rights of British Dominions

1923 Imperial Conference Imperial Economic Conference
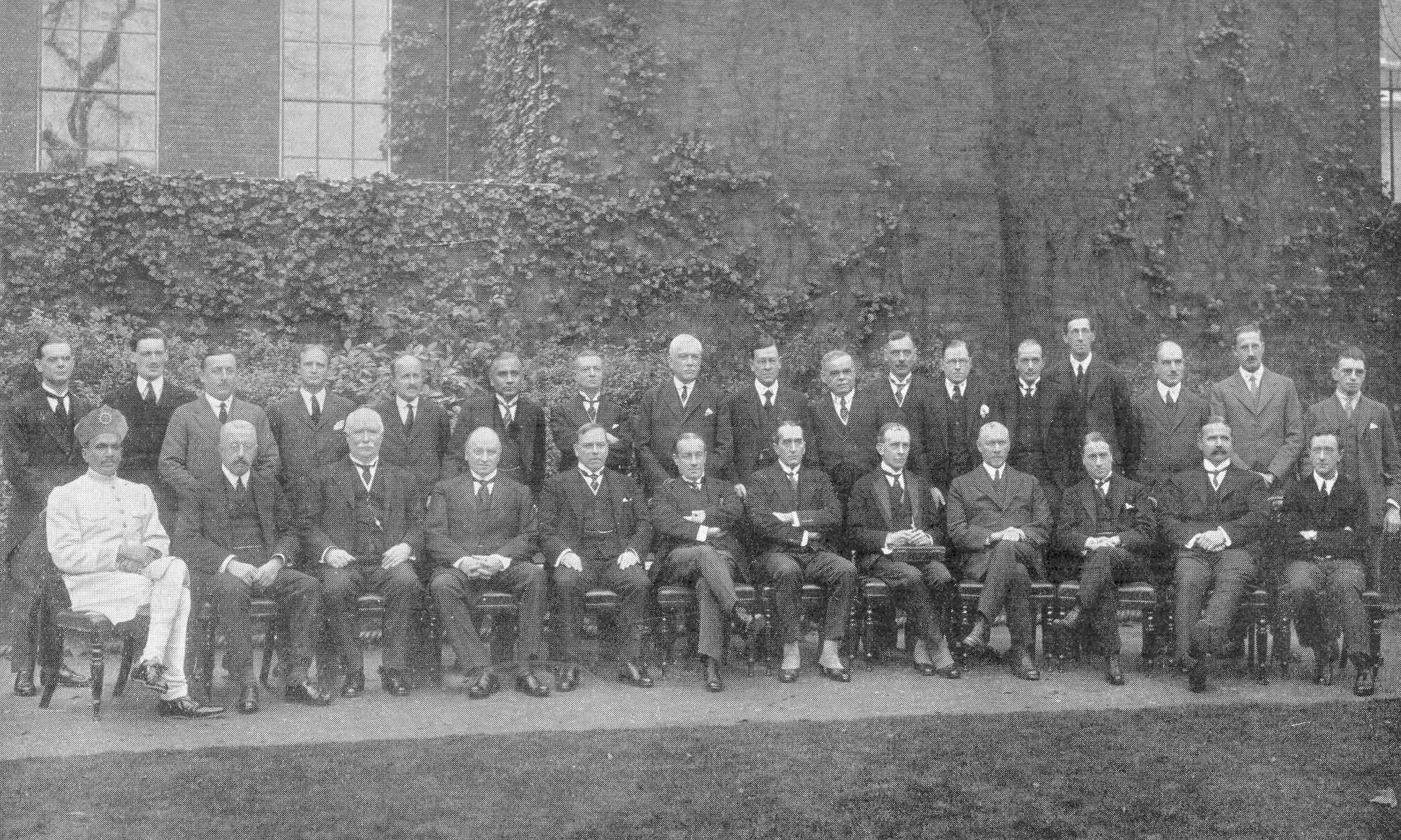
- Seated left-to-right: Maharaja of Alwar (British India), Duke of Devonshire (United Kingdom), W. F. Massey (New Zealand), Lord Curzon (United Kingdom), Mackenzie King (Canada), Stanley Baldwin (United Kingdom), Stanley Bruce (Australia), Marquess of Salisbury (United Kingdom), Jan Smuts (South Africa), W. R. Warren (Newfoundland), Viscount Peel (United Kingdom), Desmond FitzGerald (Ireland)
- Host country: United Kingdom
- Date: 1 October 1923– 8 November 1923
- Cities: London
- Venues: 10 Downing Street
- Heads of State or Government: 8
- Chair: Stanley Baldwin (Prime Minister)
- Follows: 1921
- Precedes: 1926

Key points

The 1923 Imperial Conference met in London in the autumn of 1923, the first attended by the new Irish Free State. While named the Imperial Economic Conference, the principal activity concerned the rights of the Dominions in regards to determining their own foreign policy.

Where previous Imperial Conferences were held in public session, the 1923 conference allowing for in camera discussion with a resolution "that at meetings of this nature, where questions of high policy and of the greatest consequence to all parts of the British Commonwealth are surveyed and dealt with, it was of the first importance that the representatives present should feel able to speak among themselves with the utmost freedom and in a spirit of complete confidence."

== Background ==
The conference occurred in the wake of several important developments in Empire diplomacy. The Chanak Crisis of 1922 was a threatened military conflict between the newly formed Republic of Turkey and the United Kingdom. During the crisis, the British cabinet issued a communiqué threatening to declare war against Turkey on behalf of the UK and the Dominions. British Prime Minister David Lloyd George had not consulted the Dominions and Canada disavowed the British ultimatum: when Canadian Prime Minister William Lyon Mackenzie King referred the issue to the Canadian parliament, it declared that it alone had the authority to declare war on behalf of Canada. The other Dominion prime ministers failed to support Lloyd George's action. When a new peace treaty, the Treaty of Lausanne, was negotiated with Turkey in 1923, the Dominion governments did not participate in the negotiations or sign and they declared that the UK acted only for itself and not on behalf of the Dominions.

In addition, prior to the Imperial Conference, Canada negotiated the Halibut Treaty with the United States and did so without involving the United Kingdom or allowing the British government to sign on Canada's behalf. This was a departure from earlier practice in which the British government had sole responsibility for imperial foreign affairs and a constitutional right to conduct foreign policy on behalf of the dominions, including signing treaties on their behalf.

The British, Australian, and New Zealand governments wished the conference to adopt a broad common foreign policy statement however Canadian Prime Minister William Lyon Mackenzie King and South African Prime Minister J. B. M. Hertzog argued that allowing the conference to make decisions that were binding on the dominions would encroach on their autonomy and that foreign policy of each Dominion should be determined by that Dominion's parliament (henceforth referred to as the King-Hertzog principle).

== Results ==
The Conference affirmed the Canadian position that dominions had the right to pursue their own foreign policy autonomously from Britain and the Empire and could negotiate and sign treaties on their own behalf. It was also recognised that each member of the Empire was obliged to avoid taking any action that would injure another member and that neither the Dominion governments nor the British government could commit another to an action without its consent.

The conference's final report affirmed the Canadian and South African position and thus was a step away from the concept of a centralised British Empire in favour of a more decentralised British Commonwealth without central authority, subsequently affirmed by the Balfour Declaration of 1926 and the Statute of Westminster 1931.

Speaking at the conference on the subject of suffrage for non-whites South African politician and former Imperial War Cabinet member Jan Smuts stated,

If there was to be equal manhood suffrage over the Union, the whites would be swamped by the blacks. A distinction could not be made between Indians and Africans. They would be impelled by the inevitable force of logic to go the whole hog, and the result would be that not only would the whites be swamped in Natal by the Indians but the whites would be swamped all over South Africa by the blacks and the whole position for which the whites had striven for two hundred years or more now would be given up. So far as South Africa was concerned, therefore, it was a question of impossibility. For white South Africa it was not a question of dignity but a question of existence.

Commenting on this speech African-American historian and Pan-Africanist W. E. B. Du Bois wrote that "This almost naïve setting of the darker races beyond the pale of democracy and of modern humanity was listened to with sympathetic attention in England. It is without doubt today the dominant policy of the British Empire."

On the issue of trade, Australian prime minister Stanley Bruce lobbied hard and consistently for the Conservative government of Stanley Baldwin to make changes to Great Britain's trading arrangements to give preference to Dominion products over imports from elsewhere. Bruce argued for Empire-wide economic trading arrangements that would see domestic demands filled by production from member states before seeking supplemental imports from other countries and empires. Baldwin and the Conservatives would attempt to introduce such a scheme in Britain; however, the British public feared higher prices for basic products (particularly food), and this fear was a factor in the Conservative government's defeat in the election of December 1923. Baldwin's successor Ramsay MacDonald repudiated the plan and it would not see fruition until the British Empire Economic Conference of 1932.

The conference attempted to coordinate industrial research for the purposes of promoting intra-empire trade and this was largely successful, with Departments of Scientific and Industrial Research being founded in the UK, New Zealand and India, and the Commonwealth Institute of Science and Industry being restructured in Australia.

== See also ==
- Imperial Conference
