= 1902 Colonial Conference =

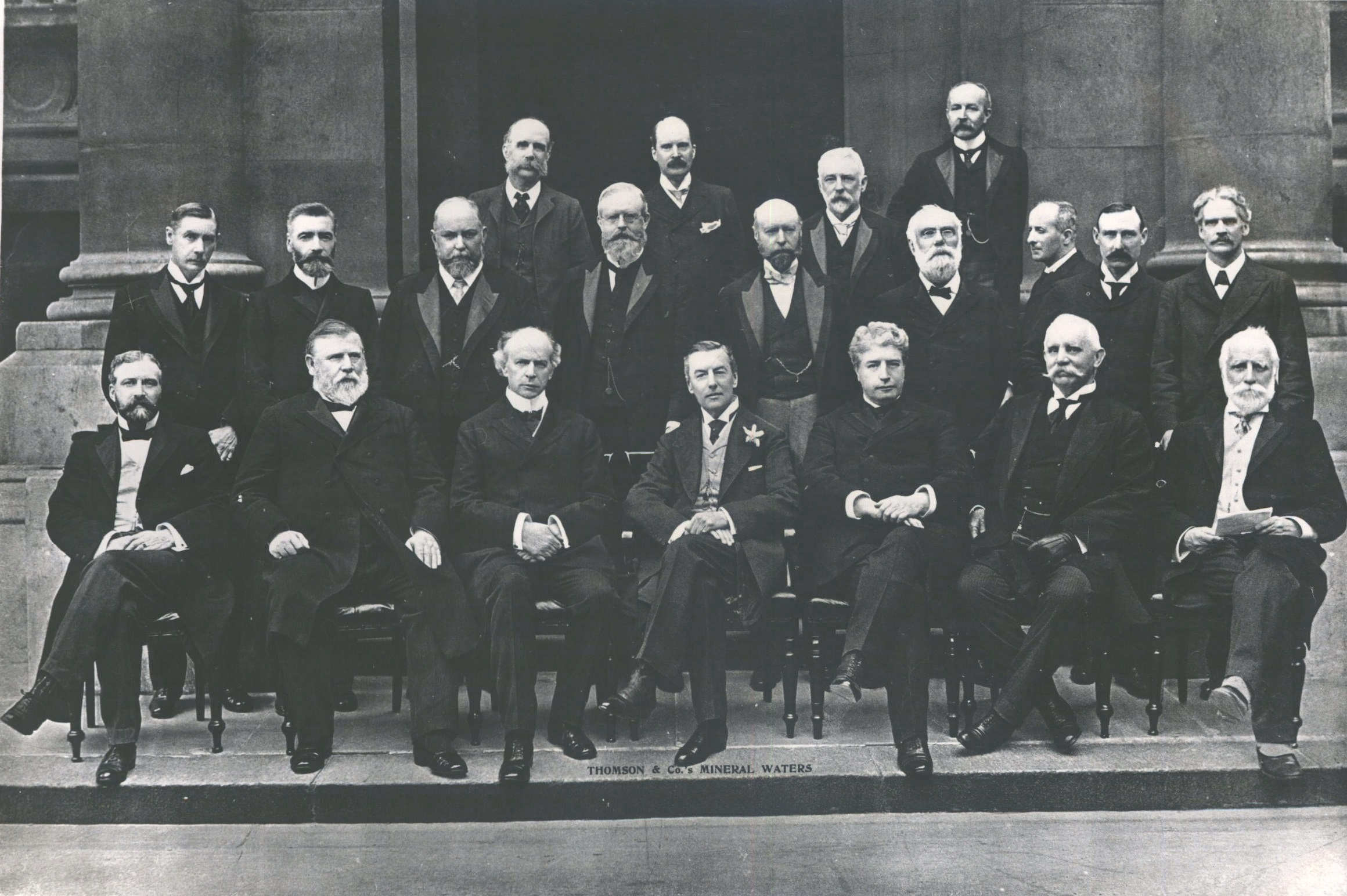
- Front row left-right: Sir Robert Bond (Premier of Newfoundland), Richard Seddon (Prime Minister of New Zealand), Sir Wilfrid Laurier (Prime Minister of Canada), Joseph Chamberlain (Secretary of State for the Colonies (Chairman)), Sir Edmund Barton (Prime Minister of Australia), Sir Albert Henry Hime (Prime Minister of Natal), Thomas Fuller (Agent-General for Cape Colony)
- Host country: (United Kingdom of Great Britain and Ireland) United Kingdom
- Dates: 30 June–11 August 1902
- Cities: London
- Heads of Government: 7
- Chair: Joseph Chamberlain (Secretary of State for the Colonies)
- Follows: 1897
- Precedes: 1907 Imperial Conference

Key points

The 1902 Colonial Conference followed the conclusion of the Boer War and was held on the occasion of the coronation of King Edward VII. As with the previous conference, it was called by Secretary of State for the Colonies Joseph Chamberlain who opened it on 30 June 1902.

Chamberlain used the occasion to resubmit his earlier proposals made at the 1897 Colonial Conference for an Imperial Council made up of colonial representatives which would act as a quasi-Imperial Parliament and make decisions for the colonies on imperial policy. This proposal, along with Chamberlain's idea for a unified imperial defence scheme, was rejected by most of the colonial prime ministers. While New Zealand proposed that each colony provide a special force for imperial defence in the case of war, Canada and Australia both believed this idea undermined self-government.

Chamberlain also proposed an imperial economic union or customs union with free trade within the empire and tariffs against goods from outside of it. The colonies, however, passed a resolution rejecting imperial free trade. A resolution in favour of imperial preference as proposed by Canada was approved and Chamberlain agreed to bring the idea to the British government. However, this plan was not implemented until the British Empire Economic Conference in 1932. Britain had more liberal trade policies than the colonies, making it hard for the British to adopt imperial preference policies without undermining its trade agreements with foreign states.

Theodore H. Boggs, an advocate for imperial federation, described the outcome of the conference as "disappointing."

== Participants ==
The conference was hosted by King Edward VII, with his Colonial Secretary and the premiers of various colonies or their representatives and members of their cabinets:

Nation	Name	Portfolio
United Kingdom	Joseph Chamberlain	Secretary of State for the Colonies (chairman)
United Kingdom	Lord Selborne	First Lord of the Admiralty
United Kingdom	Rear Admiral Wilfred Custance	Director of Naval Intelligence
United Kingdom	Lord Onslow	Under-Secretary of State for the Colonies
United Kingdom	Gerald Balfour,	President of the Board of Trade
United Kingdom	Sir Montagu Ommanney	Permanent Under-Secretary for the Colonies
United Kingdom	Sir Francis Hopwood	Permanent Secretary to the Board of Trade
United Kingdom	Sir Thomas Holderness	Secretary of the Revenue, Statistics and Commerce Department, India Office
United Kingdom	Sir John Anderson	Secretary to the Conference, of the Colonial Office
Australia	Sir Edmund Barton	Prime Minister
Australia	Sir John Forrest	Minister of Defence
Canada	Sir Wilfrid Laurier	Prime Minister
Canada	William Stevens Fielding	Minister of Finance
Canada	Sir William Mulock	Postmaster General of Canada
Canada	William Paterson	Minister of Customs
(British Cape Colony) Cape Colony	Sir John Gordon Sprigg	Prime Minister
(British Cape Colony) Cape Colony	Thomas Fuller	Agent-General
Natal	Sir Albert Henry Hime	Prime Minister
(Dominion of Newfoundland) Newfoundland	Sir Robert Bond	Premier
New Zealand	Richard Seddon	Prime Minister

== See also ==
- Imperial Conference
