= 1926 Imperial Conference =

Conference between nations in the Commonwealth

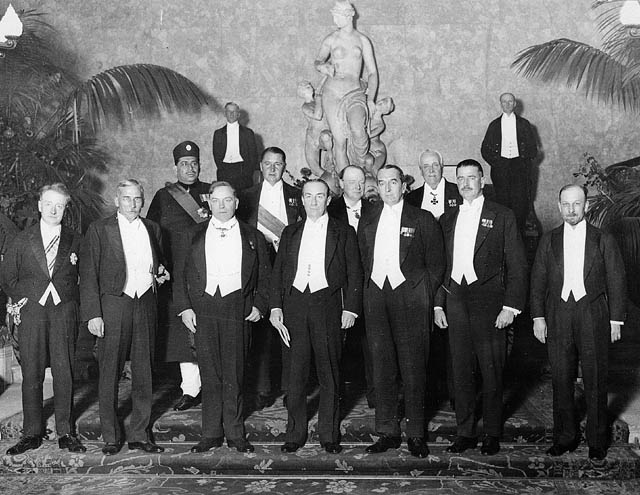
- Host country: United Kingdom
- Date: 19 October 1926– 23 November 1926
- Cities: London
- Venues: Lancaster House
- Heads of State or Government: 8
- Chair: Stanley Baldwin (Prime Minister)
- Follows: 1923
- Precedes: 1930

Key points

The 1926 Imperial Conference was the fifth Imperial Conference bringing together the prime ministers of the Dominions of the British Empire. It was held in London from 19 October to 23 November 1926. The conference was notable for producing the Balfour Declaration, which established the principle that the dominions are all equal in status, and "autonomous communities within the British Empire" not subordinate to the United Kingdom. The term "Commonwealth" was officially adopted to describe the community.

The conference was arranged to follow directly after the 1926 Assembly of the League of Nations (in Geneva, Switzerland), to reduce the amount of travelling required for the dominions' representatives.

The conference created the Inter-Imperial Relations Committee, chaired by Arthur Balfour, to look into future constitutional arrangements for the Commonwealth. In the end, the committee rejected the idea of a codified constitution, as espoused by South Africa's former Prime Minister Jan Smuts, but also fell short of endorsing the "end of empire" espoused by Smuts's arch-rival, Barry Hertzog. The recommendations were adopted unanimously by the conference on 15 November, followed by an equally warm reception in the newspapers.

== Participants ==
The conference was hosted by King-Emperor George V, with his Prime Ministers and members of their respective cabinets:

| Nation | Name | Portfolio |
|---|---|---|
| United Kingdom | Stanley Baldwin | Prime Minister (chairman) |
| United Kingdom | The Earl of Balfour | Lord President of the Council |
| United Kingdom | Winston Churchill | Chancellor of the Exchequer |
| United Kingdom | Sir Austen Chamberlain | Foreign Secretary |
| United Kingdom | Sir William Joynson-Hicks | Home Secretary |
| United Kingdom | Leo Amery | Colonial Secretary and Dominions Secretary |
| United Kingdom | Sir Laming Worthington-Evans | War Secretary |
| United Kingdom | Sir Samuel Hoare | Air Secretary |
| United Kingdom | William Bridgeman | First Lord of the Admiralty |
| United Kingdom | Sir Philip Cunliffe-Lister | President of the Board of Trade |
| United Kingdom | The Viscount Cecil of Chelwood | Chancellor of the Duchy of Lancaster |
| United Kingdom | The Earl of Clarendon | Under Dominions Secretary |
| United Kingdom | William Ormsby-Gore | Under Colonial Secretary |
| United Kingdom | Sir Philip Sassoon | Under Air Secretary |
| Australia | Stanley Bruce | Prime Minister |
| Australia | Sir Neville Howse | Minister for Defence and Minister for Health |
| Australia | John Latham | Attorney-General |
| Canada | William Lyon Mackenzie King | Prime Minister |
| Canada | Ernest Lapointe | Minister of Justice and Attorney General |
| (British Raj) India | The Earl of Birkenhead | Secretary of State |
| (British Raj) India | The Earl of Winterton | Under-Secretary of State |
| Irish Free State | W. T. Cosgrave | President of the Executive Council |
| Irish Free State | Kevin O'Higgins | Vice-President of the Executive Council and Minister for Justice |
| Irish Free State | Desmond FitzGerald | Minister for External Affairs |
| Irish Free State | Patrick McGilligan | Minister for Industry and Commerce |
| Irish Free State | James McNeill | Irish High Commissioner to United Kingdom |
| (Dominion of Newfoundland) Newfoundland | Walter Stanley Monroe | Prime Minister |
| (Dominion of Newfoundland) Newfoundland | William J. Higgins | Minister of Justice |
| (Dominion of Newfoundland) Newfoundland | Alfred B. Morine | Minister without portfolio |
| New Zealand | Gordon Coates | Prime Minister |
| New Zealand | Sir Francis Bell | Minister without portfolio |
| South Africa | J. B. M. Hertzog | Prime Minister |
| South Africa | Nicolaas Havenga | Finance Minister |
