= 1907 Imperial Conference =

Meeting of leaders of the British Empire and its colonies in London

- Host country: (United Kingdom of Great Britain and Ireland) United Kingdom
- Dates: 15 April 1907– 14 May 1907
- Cities: London
- Heads of Government: 7
- Chair: Sir Henry Campbell-Bannerman (Prime Minister)
- Follows: 1902 Colonial Conference
- Precedes: 1911

Key points
- Dominion status, co-ordination of Imperial defence, Irish Home Rule, self-government for India, Imperial preference

The 1907 Imperial Conference was convened in London on 15 April 1907 and concluded on 14 May 1907. During the sessions a resolution was passed renaming this and future meetings Imperial Conferences; previously, they had been called Colonial Conferences. The chairman of the conference was British prime minister Sir Henry Campbell-Bannerman.

The conference decided to cease referring to self-governing British colonies as colonies and conferred upon them dominion status. Canada and Australia were referred to as dominions in the conference's statements while Newfoundland Colony and the Colony of New Zealand were granted dominion status by royal proclamation on 26 September. Natal and Cape Colony would unite with the two Boer colonies of Orange River Colony and Transvaal Colony, which had been given self-government in 1907, to form the Union of South Africa as a dominion in 1910.

The possibilities of Irish Home Rule and self-governance for India were also discussed. Imperial preference was raised but rejected by the British prime minister due to British support for free trade.

== Participants ==
The conference was hosted by King-Emperor Edward VII, with his prime ministers and members of their respective cabinets:

Nation	Name	Portfolio
United Kingdom	Sir Henry Campbell-Bannerman	Prime Minister (chairman)
United Kingdom	Lord Elgin	Secretary of State for the Colonies
United Kingdom	Sir Edward Grey	Foreign Secretary
United Kingdom	Lord Tweedmouth	First Lord of the Admiralty
United Kingdom	R. B. Haldane	Secretary of State for War
United Kingdom	H. H. Asquith	Chancellor of the Exchequer
United Kingdom	David Lloyd George	President of the Board of Trade
United Kingdom	Sydney Buxton	Postmaster General of the United Kingdom
United Kingdom	Lord Lorebrun	Lord Chancellor
United Kingdom	John Burns	President of the Local Government Board
United Kingdom	John Morley	Secretary of State for India
United Kingdom	Lord Crewe	Lord President of the Council
United Kingdom	Winston Churchill	Under-Secretary of State for the Colonies
Australia	Alfred Deakin	Prime Minister
Australia	Sir William Lyne	Minister for Trade and Customs
Canada	Sir Wilfrid Laurier	Prime Minister
Canada	Sir Frederick William Borden	Minister of Militia and Defence
Canada	Louis-Philippe Brodeur	Minister of Marine and Fisheries
(British Cape Colony) Cape Colony	Leander Starr Jameson	Prime Minister
(British Cape Colony) Cape Colony	Thomas Smartt	Commissioner of Works
Natal	Frederick Robert Moor	Prime Minister
(Transvaal Colony) Transvaal	Louis Botha	Premier
(Transvaal Colony) Transvaal	Sir Richard Solomon	Agent-General
(Dominion of Newfoundland) Newfoundland Colony	Sir Robert Bond	Prime Minister
Colony of New Zealand	Sir Joseph Ward	Prime Minister

== See also ==
- Imperial Conference
