= 1921 Imperial Conference =

British Empire political event

- Host country: (United Kingdom of Great Britain and Ireland) United Kingdom
- Dates: 20 June 1921– 5 August 1921
- Cities: London
- Venues: 10 Downing Street
- Participants: Australia; Canada; India; New Zealand; Union of South Africa; UK
- Heads of Government: 6
- Chair: David Lloyd George (Prime Minister)
- Follows: Imperial War Conference (1917–1918)
- Precedes: 1923

Key points

The 1921 Imperial Conference met in London from 20 June to 5 August 1921. It was chaired by British prime minister David Lloyd George.

The Prime Ministers of the United Kingdom and the Dominions met at the 1921 Imperial Conference to determine a unified international policy, particularly the relationship with the United States and the Empire of Japan. The most urgent issue was that of whether or not to renew the Anglo-Japanese Alliance, which was due to expire on 13 July 1921. On one side were the Prime Minister of Australia, Billy Hughes, and the Prime Minister of New Zealand, Bill Massey, who strongly favoured its renewal. Neither wanted their countries to be caught up in a war between the United States and Japan, and contrasted the generous assistance that Japan rendered during the First World War with the United States' disengagement from international affairs in its aftermath. "The British Empire", declared Hughes, "must have a reliable friend in the Pacific". They were opposed by the Prime Minister of Canada, Arthur Meighen, on the grounds that the alliance would adversely affect the relationship with the United States, which Canada depended upon for its security. As a result, no decision to renew was reached, and the alliance was allowed to expire.

This was the first Imperial Conference to which the colony of India was invited, though it was still a colony and not a dominion. However, it was primarily represented by the British cabinet minister responsible for the subcontinent.

== Participants ==
The conference was hosted by King-Emperor George V, with his Prime Ministers and members of their respective cabinets:

Nation	Name	Portfolio
United Kingdom	David Lloyd George	Prime Minister (Chairman)
United Kingdom	Austen Chamberlain	Lord Privy Seal
United Kingdom	Arthur Balfour	Lord President of the Council
United Kingdom	George Curzon	Foreign Secretary
United Kingdom	Winston Churchill	Secretary of State for the Colonies
Australia	William Hughes	Prime Minister
Canada	Arthur Meighen	Prime Minister
Canada	Charles Ballantyne	Minister of Naval Service
(British Raj) India	Edwin Samuel Montagu	Secretary of State for India
(British Raj) India	Khengarji III	Maharao of Cutch
(British Raj) India	V. S. Srinivasa Sastri	Member of the Council of State of India
New Zealand	William Massey	Prime Minister
South Africa	Jan Smuts	Prime Minister
South Africa	Sir Thomas Smartt	Minister of Agriculture
South Africa	Hendrik Mentz	Minister of Defence

== See also ==
- Imperial Conference
