= 1911 Imperial Conference =

Conference in London

- Host country: (United Kingdom of Great Britain and Ireland) United Kingdom
- Dates: 23 May 1911– 20 June 1911
- Cities: London
- Heads of Government: 6
- Chair: H. H. Asquith (Prime Minister)
- Follows: 1907
- Precedes: Imperial War Conference (1917–1918)

Key points
- Imperial constitutional arrangements, Imperial Federation, international relations and treaties

The 1911 Imperial Conference convened in London on 23 May 1911 and concluded on 20 June 1911. It was held to mark the occasion of the coronation of King George V on 22 June 1911.

The conference discussed Empire-wide constitutional arrangements, with proposals by New Zealand's prime minister Sir Joseph Ward for an imperial council made up of representatives of the dominions which would advise the British government on imperial matters. Ward developed this idea into a proposal for an Imperial Parliament (see Imperial Federation) which would be responsible for the Empire's foreign policy including the declaration of war and would be presided over by an Imperial executive. British prime minister H. H. Asquith rejected these proposals as infringing on British autonomy in making foreign policy, but he agreed it was necessary to consult with dominion prime ministers on certain matters. Asquith proposed a standing committee on foreign affairs, but the dominion prime ministers could not agree on a final resolution. The adoption of a new flag for the British Empire was also meant to be discussed, but this ultimately was not covered due to much of the conference being focused on the aforementioned topics.

The conference came to an agreement on the negotiation of treaties that affect various dominions and that the British government would consult the dominions when preparing its proposals for proposed international Peace Conferences and that future international peace treaties and some international agreements would be circulated to the dominions for comment prior to the British government signing them.

Australia expressed concern about Japan's growing naval power, and it was agreed that the British government would consult Australia when negotiating renewal of the Anglo-Japanese Alliance. Britain also agreed to consult South Africa about negotiations with Germany, considering its colonial aspirations in Africa.

== Participants ==
The conference was hosted by King-Emperor George V, with his Prime Ministers and members of their respective cabinets:

Nation	Name	Portfolio
United Kingdom	H. H. Asquith	Prime Minister (Chairman)
United Kingdom	Lewis Harcourt	Secretary of State for the Colonies
United Kingdom	David Lloyd George	Chancellor of the Exchequer
United Kingdom	Sir Edward Grey	Foreign Secretary
United Kingdom	Lord Loreburn	Lord Chancellor
United Kingdom	Viscount Haldane	Secretary of State for War
United Kingdom	Sydney Buxton,	President of the Board of Trade
United Kingdom	Winston Churchill	Home Secretary
United Kingdom	Herbert Samuel	Postmaster General of the United Kingdom
United Kingdom	Sir Rufus Isaacs	Attorney General for England and Wales
United Kingdom	John Burns	President of the Local Government Board
United Kingdom	Thomas McKinnon Wood	Under-Secretary of State for Foreign Affairs
Australia	Andrew Fisher	Prime Minister
Australia	Egerton Lee Batchelor	Minister for External Affairs
Australia	George Pearce	Minister for Defence
Canada	Sir Wilfrid Laurier	Prime Minister
Canada	Sir Frederick William Borden	Minister of Militia and Defence
Canada	Sir Louis-Philippe Brodeur	Minister of Marine and Fisheries
Newfoundland	Sir E. P. Morris	Prime Minister
Newfoundland	Robert Watson	Colonial Secretary
New Zealand	Sir Joseph Ward	Prime Minister
New Zealand	John Findlay	Minister of Justice and Attorney-General
South Africa	Louis Botha	Prime Minister
South Africa	F. S. Malan	Minister of Education
South Africa	Sir David Pieter de Villiers Graaff	Minister of Public Works and of Posts and Telegraphs

== See also ==
- Imperial Conference
