= Imperial War Conference =

Imperial War Conferences
- Dates: 21 March 1917 – 27 April 1917; 12 June 1918 – 26 July 1918
- Cities: London, United Kingdom
- Chair: David Lloyd George (Prime Minister)
- Follows: 1911 Imperial Conference
- Precedes: 1921 Imperial Conference

Key points
- Imperial constitutional arrangements, Imperial Federation, international relations and treaties

The Imperial War Cabinet existed concurrently with Imperial Conferences (or "Imperial War Conferences"), which were held from 21 March to 27 April 1917 and from 12 June to 26 July 1918.

In April 1917, the conference passed Resolution IX, which resolved that a conference was to be held after the war in order to rearrange Imperial constitutional arrangements "based upon a full recognition of the Dominions as autonomous nations of an Imperial Commonwealth", and should give the Dominions and India "a right... to an adequate voice in foreign policy and in foreign relations." The resolution is thought to have been largely authored by Jan Smuts and Robert Borden. The Imperial War Conference acknowledged the importance of the whole empire in defence policy by admitting India, not yet self-governing, to future imperial conferences.

In 1917, the Imperial War Conference also passed a resolution regarding a future special Imperial Conference to readjust the relations of the component parts of the Empire. That readjustment should be based upon the full recognition of the dominions as autonomous nations of an Imperial Commonwealth, with an "adequate voice" in foreign policy.

== Bibliography ==
- Berriedale, Keith Arthur (1921). War government of the British dominions. Oxford: Clarendon Press. pp. 35–46. ISBN 1314614568.
