= 1894 Colonial Conference =

- Host country: Canada
- Dates: 28 June–9 July 1894
- Cities: Ottawa
- Venues: Senate Chamber and Office of the Minister of Trade & Commerce
- Participants: 9 governments
- Chair: Mackenzie Bowell (Canadian Minister of Trade and Commerce)
- Follows: 1887
- Precedes: 1897

Key points

The 1894 Colonial Conference was called by the government of Canada to continue discussion begun at the 1887 Colonial Conference on a proposal to lay a telegraph cable at the bottom of the Pacific Ocean to create a communications link between Canada and Australasia and, by extension, to the rest of the British Empire as part of what became referred to as the All Red Line network of cables throughout the Empire.

The opening ceremonies were in the Senate Chamber in the Centre Block of the Canadian parliament buildings but day-to-day meetings occurred in the offices of the Minister of Trade and Commerce.

The Earl of Jersey attended the conference as the representative of the British government and was instructed to listen and report back but not to make any commitments on behalf of the government.

All self-governing British colonies were invited to send delegates with the exception of Newfoundland Colony. Western Australia and Natal Colony did not send representatives due to domestic priorities. The colony of Fiji was also invited due to its geographical location on the proposed route of the cable but declined. Delegates were sent to the conference by Canada, New Zealand, the Australian self-governing colonies of New South Wales, Queensland, South Australia, Tasmania and Victoria and the South African colony of Cape Colony. Unlike other colonial conference, the colonial delegates were cabinet ministers or legislators or government representatives rather than Prime Ministers.

Resolutions were proposed to the conference and it was agreed that decisions would be made on the basis of "one colony, one vote" but the resolutions were not binding on the British government or the Colonial Office.

In addition to discussing telecommunications issues, the conference also approved a resolution favouring preferential trade within the Empire, however, this resolution was opposed by Australia's largest colonies, New South Wales and Queensland, who were suspicious the Canadian initiative seemed designed to undermine Australia's protective tariffs. The proposal would be made again to the 1897 Colonial Conference but was not agreed to and would not be acted upon until the British Empire Economic Conference in 1932.

== Participants ==
The conference was hosted by Canada with representatives of the governments of various colonies in attendance.

Nation	Name	Portfolio
United Kingdom	Earl of Jersey	Representing the British government
Canada	Mackenzie Bowell	Minister of Trade and Commerce
Canada	Sir Adolphe-Philippe Caron	Postmaster-General
Canada	George Eulas Foster	Minister of Finance
Canada	Sanford Fleming	Engineer
(British Cape Colony) Cape Colony	Sir Henry de Villiers	Chief Justice of the Cape Colony
(British Cape Colony) Cape Colony	Jan Hendrik Hofmeyr	Member of the Cape House of Assembly
(British Cape Colony) Cape Colony	Sir Charles Mills	Agent-General
New South Wales	Francis Bathurst Suttor	Minister of Public Instruction
Colony of New Zealand	Alfred Lee Smith	Delegate of the New Zealand government
Queensland	Andrew Joseph Thynne	Minister without portfolio and Member of the Queensland Legislative Council
Queensland	William Forrest	Member of the Queensland Legislative Council
South Australia	Thomas Playford	Agent-General
Colony of Tasmania	Nicholas Fitzgerald	Delegate (representing Tasmania and Victoria)
(Victoria (state)) Victoria	Sir Henry John Wrixon	Member of the Victorian Legislative Assembly
(Victoria (state)) Victoria	Nicholas Fitzgerald	Member of the Victorian Legislative Council
(Victoria (state)) Victoria	Simon Fraser	Member of the Victorian Legislative Council

== See also ==
- Imperial Conference
- All Red Line – the telegraph network that eventually spanned the British Empire.
