= Ottawa Agreement =

The Ottawa Agreement may refer to:

- British Empire Economic Conference
- NATO Ottawa Agreement
