= 1937 Imperial Conference =

British Empire meeting in London, England

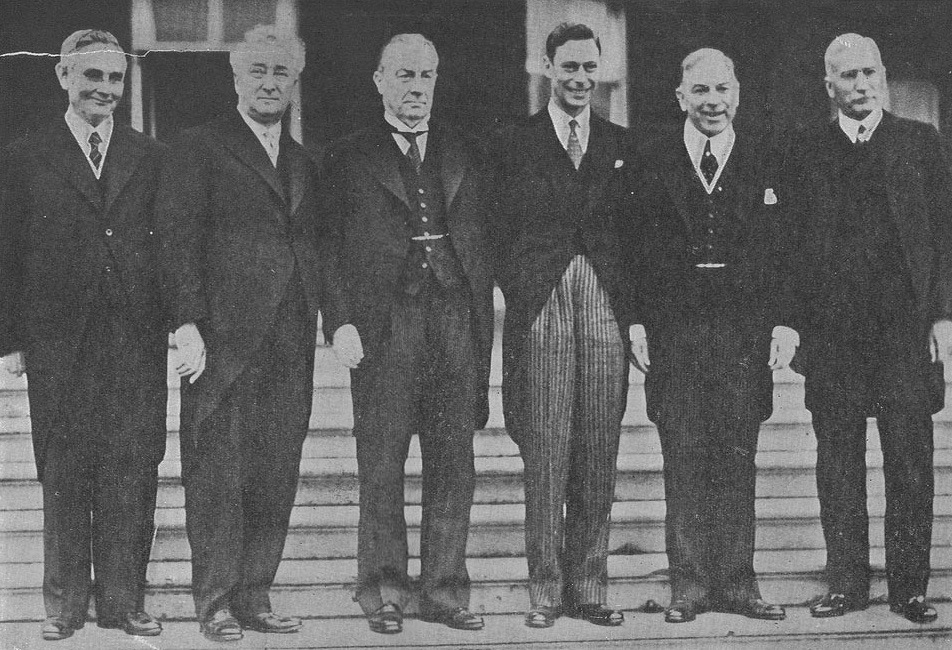
- Host country: United Kingdom
- Date: 14 May–24 June 1937
- Cities: London
- Venues: St. James’s Palace
- Heads of State or Government: 8
- Chair: Stanley Baldwin (to 28 May), Neville Chamberlain (from 28 May) (Prime Minister of the United Kingdom)
- Follows: 1932
- Precedes: 1944 Commonwealth Prime Ministers' Conference

Key points
- Foreign affairs, defence, trade, Imperial Federation

The 1937 Imperial Conference was held in London from 14 May to 24 June 1937, following the coronation of King George VI and Queen Elizabeth on 12 May. It was the eighth and final Imperial Conference and the last meeting of British and dominion prime ministers held until World War II.

Topics included the foreign affairs and defence - in particular whether or not the foreign policies of the dominions should follow that of the British government, trade policy and constitutional arrangements. On the last question, the proposal for an Imperial Federation was discussed and dismissed.

The conference was attended by representatives of the United Kingdom, Canada, Australia, New Zealand, South Africa, India, Southern Rhodesia and Burma. Newfoundland was represented by the UK Secretary of State for Dominion Affairs and the colonial empire by the UK Secretary of State for the Colonies. It was the first Imperial Conference in which the Irish Free State chose not to participate. Nonetheless, the Irish Free State was still regarded as a Commonwealth member.

Delegates attended plenary meetings for the opening and closing sessions of the Conference, on 14 May and 15 June respectively, and during the intervening month there were twenty meetings of principal delegates. Sub-committees gave specialised attention to a number of topics, including imperial shipping, economic questions, constitutional questions, civil air communications, Antarctica and the New Hebrides. During the conference, on 28 May, there was a changeover in the office of Prime Minister of the United Kingdom from Stanley Baldwin to Neville Chamberlain.

New Zealand Prime Minister Michael Joseph Savage attended, with High Commissioner Bill Jordan and civil servant Carl Berendsen (who recalled that neither Ireland or South Africa were represented). The New Zealand government was opposed to appeasement and Italy's invasion of Abyssinia (Ethiopia). Savage criticised appeasement at the conference, saying "Is your policy peace at any price; if it is so I cannot accept it". Anthony Eden replied "No, not at any price, but peace at almost any price", to which Savage replied: "You can pay too high a price even for peace".

== The Conference ==
The conference was hosted by King-Emperor George VI, with his Prime Ministers and members of their respective cabinets:

Nation	Name	Portfolio
United Kingdom	Stanley Baldwin (until 28 May); Neville Chamberlain (from 28 May)	Prime Minister (Chairman)
Australia	Joseph Lyons	Prime Minister
(Myanmar) Burma	Ba Maw	Chief Minister
Canada	William Lyon Mackenzie King	Prime Minister
(British Raj) India	The Marquess of Zetland	Secretary of State
New Zealand	Michael Joseph Savage	Prime Minister
Southern Rhodesia	Godfrey Huggins	Prime Minister
South Africa	J. B. M. Hertzog	Prime Minister
