= Henry D'Esterre Taylor =

Henry D'Esterre Taylor, (11 January 1853 – 28 April 1909), was an Australian banker and Federationist.

== Early life ==
Taylor was born on 11 January 1853 at Richmond barracks, Melbourne, the eldest child of Robert Crofton Taylor, a policeman, and his wife Mary Jane, née D'Esterre. In 1870 he commenced work with the Melbourne Savings Bank (later the State Savings Bank of Victoria and now part of the Commonwealth Bank).

== Politics ==
A free trader, Taylor became a member of the Victorian branch of the Imperial Federation League in 1885. He was instrumental in ensuring the Victorian Branch survived the collapse of the parent group in London in 1893.

The league promoted closer union within the British Empire and advocated the establishment of an Imperial parliament to be composed of representatives of Britain and the self-governing members of the Empire. Taylor was honorary secretary of the Victorian branch from 1895 to 1907.

Taylor was a supporter of the federation of the Australian colonies as a first step in the greater federation. He joined the Melbourne branch of the Australian Natives' Association, hoping to gain members. He clashed with republicans over his I.F.L. prize-winning essay, The Advantages of Imperial Federation (Melbourne, 1888). His address, "Three Great Federations: Australasian, National and Racial" (London, 1890), delivered to the A.N.A. at Ballarat, met with approval insofar as he urged Australian Federation; but his advocacy of Imperial Federation and, ultimately, a federation of the British races aroused heated opposition. Although Taylor held that trade, defence and financial advantage would flow from Imperial Federation, others feared that in such an organization Australia's voice would be submerged.

The conservative Melbourne Argus supported Taylor; the radical Age opposed him.

Taylor was an I.F.L. delegate to the 1893 Corowa conference of the A.N.A.

He was once described as an "Australian imbecile" but was a gifted debater and art critic. A pamphleteer for the I.F.L., he also wrote for other periodicals.

== Banking ==
A mathematician, Taylor had been inspector of branches, accountant, assistant auditor and manager of city branches of the Melbourne Savings Bank until ill-health forced him to retire in March 1908.

He was a foundation member (1886–1906) of the Bankers' Institute of Australasia and contributed articles to its journal. Taylor never married. He died of cerebral sclerosis on 28 April 1909 at East Melbourne and is buried in the Melbourne General Cemetery.
