= Imperial Conference =

19th & 20th Century gatherings of British Imperial officials

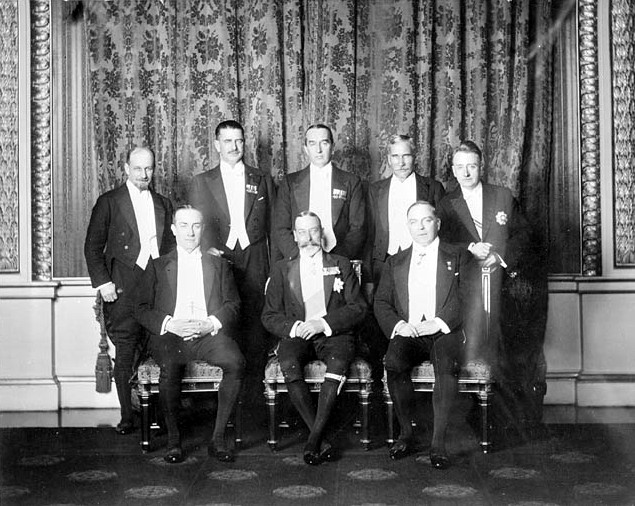
King George V (front, centre) with his prime ministers in 1926. Standing (left to right): Walter Stanley Monroe (Newfoundland), Gordon Coates (New Zealand), Stanley Bruce (Australia), J. B. M. Hertzog (Union of South Africa), W. T. Cosgrave (Irish Free State). Seated: Stanley Baldwin (United Kingdom), King George V, William Lyon Mackenzie King (Canada).

Imperial Conferences (Colonial Conferences before 1907) were periodic gatherings of government leaders from the self-governing colonies and dominions of the British Empire between 1887 and 1937, before the establishment of regular Meetings of Commonwealth Prime Ministers in 1944. They were held in 1887, 1894, 1897, 1902, 1907, 1911, 1921, 1923, 1926, 1930, 1932 and 1937.

All the conferences were held in London, the seat of the Empire, except for the 1894 and 1932 conferences which were held in Ottawa, the capital of the senior Dominion of the Crown. The 1907 conference changed the name of the meetings to Imperial Conferences and agreed that the meetings should henceforth be regular rather than taking place while overseas statesmen were visiting London for royal occasions (e.g. jubilees and coronations).

== List of conferences ==
Year	Date	Host	Location	Retreat	Chairman
1887	4 April – 6 May	United Kingdom	London	Senate House, Bloomsbury	Lord Salisbury
1894	28 June – 9 July	Canada	Ottawa	Centre Block	Mackenzie Bowell
1897	24 June – 8 July	United Kingdom	London	Colonial Office, Whitehall	Joseph Chamberlain
1902	30 June – 11 August	United Kingdom	London		Joseph Chamberlain
1907	15 April – 14 May	United Kingdom	London		Henry Campbell-Bannerman
1911	23 May – 20 June	United Kingdom	London		H. H. Asquith
1917	21 March – 27 April	United Kingdom	London		David Lloyd George
1918	12 June – 26 July	United Kingdom	London		David Lloyd George
1921	20 June – 5 August	United Kingdom	London		David Lloyd George
1923	1 October – 8 November	United Kingdom	London		Stanley Baldwin
1926	19 October – 22 November	United Kingdom	London		Stanley Baldwin
1930	1 October – 14 November	United Kingdom	London		Ramsay MacDonald
1932	21 July – 18 August	Canada	Ottawa	House of Commons Chamber, Parliament Hill	R. B. Bennett
1937	14 May – 24 June	United Kingdom	London		Stanley Baldwin (until 28 May); Neville Chamberlain (from 28 May)

== Notable meetings ==
Originally instituted to emphasise imperial unity, as time went on, the conferences became a key forum for dominion governments to assert the desire for removing the remaining vestiges of their colonial status. The conference of 1926 agreed to the Balfour Declaration, which acknowledged that the dominions would henceforth rank as equals to the United Kingdom, as members of the 'British Commonwealth of Nations'.

The conference of 1930 decided to abolish the legislative supremacy of the British Parliament as it was expressed through the Colonial Laws Validity Act 1865 and other Imperial acts. The statesmen recommended that a declaratory enactment of Parliament, which became the Statute of Westminster 1931, be passed with the consent of the dominions, but some dominions did not ratify the statute until some years afterwards. The 1930 conference was notable, too, for the attendance of Southern Rhodesia, despite it being a self-governing colony, not a dominion.

== Towards Commonwealth meetings ==
As World War II drew to a close, Imperial Conferences were replaced by Commonwealth Prime Ministers' Conferences, with 17 such meetings occurring from 1944 until 1969, all but one of the meetings occurred in London. The gatherings were renamed Commonwealth Heads of Government Meetings (CHOGM) in 1971 and were henceforth held every two years with hosting duties rotating around the Commonwealth.

== See also ==
- British Empire Economic Conference (1932)
- Commonwealth Heads of Government Meeting
- First Colonial Conference
- Historiography of the British Empire
- Imperial War Cabinet
