= All Red Line =

Telegraph system of the British Empire

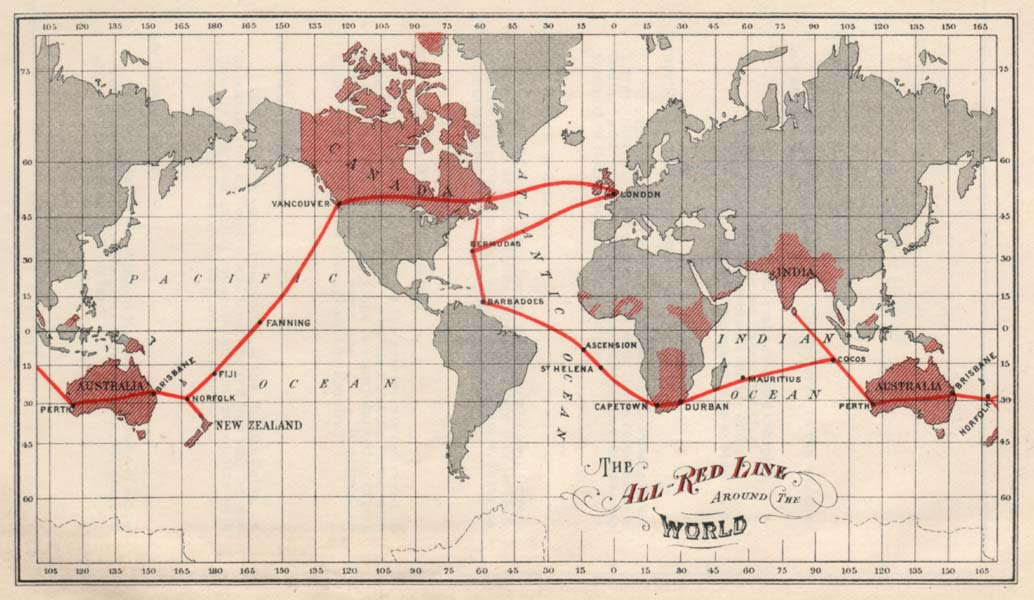
Sketch map of the All Red Line drawn in 1902 or 1903 (Note: The path of the line through Australia depicted in the image is incorrect: It should instead enter through Darwin and not Perth, with the overland telegraph line moving straight down to Adelaide through Alice Springs then connecting into Australia's existing telegraph network.)

The All Red Line was a system of electrical telegraphs that linked much of the British Empire. It was inaugurated on 31 October 1902. The informal name derives from the common practice of colouring the territory of the British Empire red or pink on political maps.

== Construction ==
The first transatlantic cable connected Ireland and Newfoundland in 1858, although it later failed. In 1866, the SS Great Eastern laid out a lasting link from Waterville, County Kerry and nearby Valentia Island, in Ireland, to Heart's Content, Newfoundland.

By 1870, Suez was linked to Bombay, and from there to Madras, Penang, and Singapore. Australia was linked to British telegraph cables directly in 1871, by extending a line from Singapore to Port Darwin, although it ran through the Dutch territory of Java. By 1872, messages could be sent direct from London to Adelaide and Sydney. Australia was linked to New Zealand by cable in 1876.

To complete the All Red Line, therefore, the final major cable laying project was the trans-Pacific section. A resolution supporting such a project was passed by the First Colonial Conference in 1887 and more detailed plans were approved at the 1894 Colonial Conference in Ottawa which was called specifically on the topic of the cable project. The "Pacific Cable Committee" was formed in 1896 to consider the proposal and in 1901 the Pacific Cable Board was formed with eight members: Three from Britain, two from Canada, two from Australia and one from New Zealand. Funding for the project was shared between the British, Canadian, New Zealand, New South Wales, Victorian and Queensland governments. In 1902 the Colonia, a newly-built cable vessel, began laying the 8,000 tonnes of cable needed to complete the Bamfield, British Columbia, to Fanning Island section of the cable. The final cost was around £2 million.

Originally, the British government felt the All Red system should have sea-landings only on British-controlled soil for security purposes. Due to this, Britain actively sought to acquire Fanning Island (now Tabuaeran in Kiribati) to use for a midpoint power regeneration / relay station between Western Canada and Australia on the trans-Pacific Ocean branch of the system. Fanning Island was annexed to the British Empire in 1888.

== Completion ==
The Committee on Imperial Defence reported in 1911 that the All Red Line was complete. The network had so many redundancies that 49 cuts would be needed to isolate the United Kingdom; 15 for Canada; and 5 for South Africa. Many colonies such as South Africa and India also had many land lines. Britain also possessed the majority of the world's underwater-telegraph deployment and repair equipment and expertise, and a monopoly of the gutta-percha insulation for underwater lines.

The 1911 report stated that the Imperial Wireless Chain should only be a "valuable reserve" to the All Red Line, because enemies could interrupt or intercept radio messages. Despite its great cost, the telegraph network succeeded in its purpose: British communications remained uninterrupted during the First World War, while Britain quickly succeeded in cutting Germany's worldwide network.

The Pacific Cable Board laid a duplicate cable between Canada and New Zealand between 1923 and 1926, using the cable-laying ships Dominia and Faraday.

== Routes ==
Atlantic Ocean stations

- Great Britain
- Ireland
- Newfoundland
- Canada
- Saint Helena
- Ascension Island
- Barbados
- Bermuda

Pacific Ocean stations

- Bamfield, British Columbia, Canada
- Fanning Island, which was deserted until the telegraph relay station was established.
- Fiji
- Hong Kong
- Norfolk Island (branching to New Zealand and Australia)
- Southport, Queensland, Australia (the Pacific Cable Station still exists and is heritage-listed)

Indian Ocean stations

- Cape Town, South Africa
- Durban, South Africa
- Keeling Islands (branching to India and Africa)
- Mauritius
- Perth, Australia

== Commonwealth Telegraph Agreement ==
In the final years of the British Empire, with a number of states federated or close to independence, a treaty with clearer financial divisions, responsibilities, and governance was established that would eventually replace the Pacific Cable Board. A treaty Commonwealth Telegraph Agreement was signed between Commonwealth nations in London, 1948 that formed the Commonwealth Telecommunications Organisation.

== See also ==
- All-Red Route
- Commonwealth Pacific Cable System
- Electrical telegraphy in the United Kingdom
