= 1944 Commonwealth Prime Ministers' Conference =

1st Commonwealth Prime Ministers' Conference
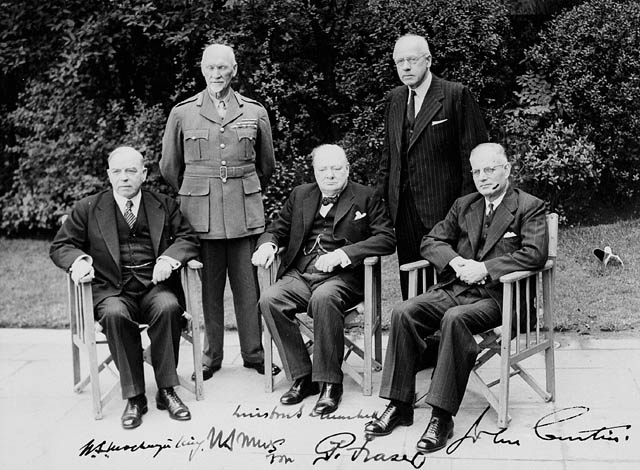
- Host country: United Kingdom
- Dates: 1 May 1944– 16 May 1944
- Cities: London
- Heads of Government: 6
- Chair: Winston Churchill (Prime Minister of the United Kingdom)
- Follows: 1937 Imperial Conference
- Precedes: 1946

Key points
- Supporting the Moscow Declaration; Coordination of war effort

The 1944 Commonwealth Prime Ministers' Conference was the first Meeting of the Heads of Government of the British Commonwealth. It was held in the United Kingdom, between 1–16 May 1944, and was hosted by British Prime Minister, Winston Churchill.

== The conference ==
=== Outline ===
The conference was attended by the Prime Ministers of all of the Dominions within the Commonwealth, except Ireland and Newfoundland. Attendees included Prime Minister John Curtin of Australia, Prime Minister William Lyon Mackenzie King of Canada, Prime Minister Peter Fraser of New Zealand and Prime Minister Jan Smuts of South Africa. Also attending was Prime Minister Sir Godfrey Huggins of the self-governing colony of Southern Rhodesia, and representing India was The Maharaja of Jammu and Kashmir. Members of the Churchill War Cabinet and the High Commissioners of the Dominions also attended.

Ireland did not participate although at the time the British Commonwealth still regarded Ireland as one of its members. Ireland had not participated in any equivalent conferences since 1932.

The British Commonwealth leaders agreed to support the Moscow Declaration and reached agreement regarding their respective roles in the overall Allied war effort.

Prior to the conference, Robert McIntyre and Douglas Young, the leaders of the Scottish National Party, lobbied King, Fraser, Smuts, Huggins, and Curtin, asking them to raise the issue of Scottish independence at the conference and to invite Scotland to take part in it and all future Commonwealth Conferences. Curtin viewed it as an internal matter for the British government, King was sympathetic, and the remainder simply voiced their acknowledgement of the communiques.

Churchill failed to obtain the demonstration of Commonwealth solidarity that he had sought. The American journal Business Week concluded that the real winner of the conference was the United States. Churchill omitted the conference in his memories.

=== Participants ===
==== Ministers ====
Nation	Name	Portfolio
United Kingdom	Winston Churchill	Prime Minister (chairman)
United Kingdom	Clement Attlee	Deputy Prime Minister
United Kingdom	The Lord Beaverbrook	Lord Privy Seal
United Kingdom	Sir John Anderson	Chancellor of the Exchequer
United Kingdom	Anthony Eden	Foreign Secretary
United Kingdom	Herbert Morrison	Home Secretary
United Kingdom	The Viscount Cranborne	Dominions Secretary
United Kingdom	Oliver Stanley	Colonial Secretary
United Kingdom	Leo Amery	India and Burma Secretary
United Kingdom	Sir Percy Grigg	War Secretary
United Kingdom	A. V. Alexander	First Lord of the Admiralty
United Kingdom	Sir Archibald Sinclair, Bt	Air Secretary
United Kingdom	Sir Stafford Cripps	Minister of Aircraft Production
United Kingdom	Brendan Bracken	Minister of Information
United Kingdom	Ernest Bevin	Minister of Labour and National Service
United Kingdom	Oliver Lyttelton	Minister of Production
United Kingdom	The Lord Woolton	Minister of Reconstruction
United Kingdom	The Lord Cherwell	Paymaster General
Australia	John Curtin	Prime Minister
Australia	Stanley Bruce	High Commissioner
Canada	William Lyon Mackenzie King	Prime Minister
Canada	Vincent Massey	High Commissioner
(British Raj) India	Hari Singh	The Maharaja of Jammu and Kashmir
(British Raj) India	Sir Feroz Khan Noon	Delegate
New Zealand	Peter Fraser	Prime Minister
New Zealand	Bill Jordan	High Commissioner
South Africa	Jan Smuts	Prime Minister
South Africa	Deneys Reitz	High Commissioner
Southern Rhodesia	Sir Godfrey Huggins	Prime Minister

==== Military ====
Service	Head	Name
Army	Chief of the Imperial General Staff	Field Marshal Sir Alan Brooke
Navy	First Sea Lord	Admiral of the Fleet Sir Andrew Cunningham
RAF	Chief of the Air Staff	Marshal of the Royal Air Force Sir Charles Portal

- AUS General Sir Thomas Blamey
- UK Lieutenant-general Sir Hastings Ismay
- NZL Lieutenant-general Edward Puttick

==== Diplomats and civil servants ====
- AUS Sir Frederick Shedden Secretary, Department of Defence
- CAN Norman Robertson
- UK Sir John Stephenson
- UK Sir Richard Hopkins Permanent Secretary to the Treasury

== See also ==
- List of Allied World War II conferences
