= 1897 Colonial Conference =

Conference between the Secretary of State for the Colonies and the British Empire

- Host country: (United Kingdom of Great Britain and Ireland) United Kingdom
- Dates: 24 June–8 July 1897
- Cities: London
- Venues: Colonial Office, Whitehall
- Heads of Government: 11
- Chair: Joseph Chamberlain (Secretary of State for the Colonies)
- Follows: 1894
- Precedes: 1902

Key points

The 1897 Colonial Conference was a conference between the Secretary of State for the Colonies and the 11 self-governing colonies of the British Empire. The conference was convened in London by Colonial Secretary Joseph Chamberlain in 1897 on the occasion of the Diamond Jubilee of Queen Victoria. Chamberlain's intention was to draw the self-governing colonies into closer co-operation with the United Kingdom.

Delegates were sent to the conference by Canada, Newfoundland Colony, New Zealand, the Australian self-governing colonies of New South Wales, Queensland, South Australia, Tasmania, Victoria and Western Australia, and the South African Cape Colony and Colony of Natal.

Chamberlain proposed the creation of a permanent Imperial Council made up of delegates from the colonies to act as an Empire-wide parliament with the power to bind the colonies on imperial matters but this was rejected by the colonies due to fears of loss of autonomy. Chamberlain also propose that colonies increase their contributions to the Royal Navy but only some colonies agreed to increase their contributions and no permanent arrangement was agreed to.

Chamberlain also proposed a customs union between the colonies and Britain while Canada proposed preferential trade but no decision was made by the delegates.

== Participants ==
The conference was hosted by Queen Victoria, with her Colonial Secretary and the premiers of various colonies:

| Nation | Name | Portfolio |
|---|---|---|
| United Kingdom | Joseph Chamberlain | Secretary of State for the Colonies (Chairman) |
| United Kingdom | William Palmer, 2nd Earl of Selborne | Under-Secretary of State for the Colonies |
| United Kingdom | Sir John Bramston | Assistant Under-Secretary of State for the Colonies |
| Canada | Sir Wilfrid Laurier | Prime Minister |
| (British Cape Colony) Cape Colony | Sir John Gordon Sprigg | Prime Minister |
| Colony of Natal | Sir Harry Escombe | Prime Minister |
| (Dominion of Newfoundland) Newfoundland Colony | Sir William Whiteway | Premier |
| Colony of New South Wales | Sir George Reid | Premier |
| Colony of New Zealand | Richard Seddon | Premier |
| Colony of Queensland | Sir Hugh Nelson | Premier |
| South Australia | Charles Kingston | Premier |
| Colony of Tasmania | Sir Edward Braddon | Premier |
| (Victoria (state)) Victoria | Sir George Turner | Premier |
| Western Australia | Sir John Forrest | Premier |

== See also ==
- Imperial Conference
