= 1887 Colonial Conference =

Meeting of leaders of the British Empire and its colonies in London

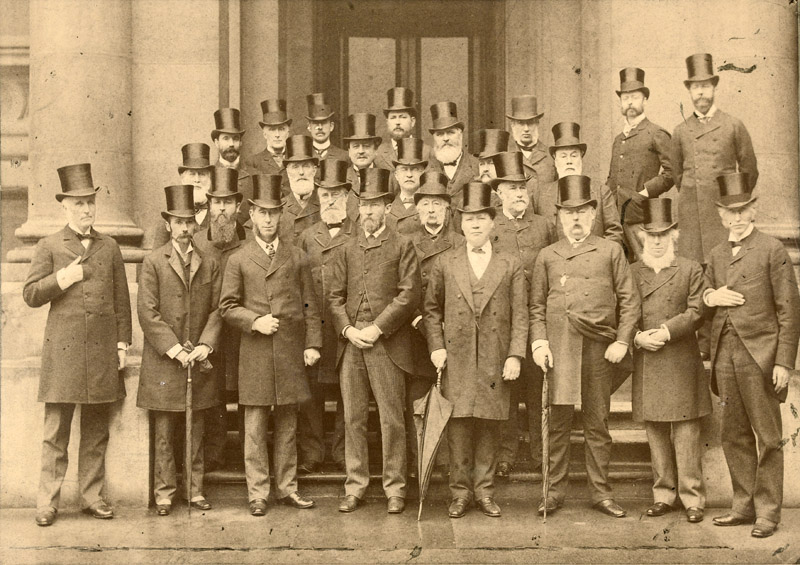
- Attending representatives
- Host country: (United Kingdom of Great Britain and Ireland) United Kingdom
- Dates: 4 April–6 May 1887
- Cities: London
- Chair: Sir Henry Thurston Holland (Secretary of State for the Colonies)
- Precedes: 1894

Key points
- Imperial co-operation, Naval defence, Pacific telegraph cable, Royal title

The 1887 Colonial Conference met in London in 1887 on the occasion of Queen Victoria's Golden Jubilee. It was organised at the behest of the Imperial Federation League in hopes of creating closer ties between the colonies, the Dominion of Canada and the United Kingdom. It was attended by more than 100 delegates, mostly unofficial observers, from both self-governing and dependent colonies. India, however, was not represented.

Among other things discussed, the colonies in Australia and New Zealand agreed to pay £126,000 (equivalent to £14,324,000 in 2025) per annum towards the Royal Navy to help pay for the United Kingdom's naval deployments in the Pacific. In exchange, the British government agreed not to reduce its Pacific Station without colonial consent.

A proposal to lay a telegraph cable between Vancouver and Australia was approved. A Resolution to extend the Queen's title to "Queen of the United Kingdom of Great Britain, Ireland, and the Colonies, and all Dependencies thereof, and Empress of India" was also adopted.

The conference was only a deliberative body and resolutions passed were not binding. While this was the case and the conference itself was not established by law, it was seen as a formal step in the process of consultation concerning imperial policy and legislation.

== Participants ==
The conference was hosted by Queen Victoria, Empress of India, and her prime minister, Lord Salisbury, with Sir Henry Thurston Holland (Secretary of State for the Colonies) acting as chair and the premiers and other representatives of various colonies as delegates. The colonies and dominions invited to send delegates were Newfoundland Colony, Canada, Colony of New South Wales, Colony of Tasmania, Cape of Good Hope, South Australia, the Colony of New Zealand, Victoria, Queensland, Western Australia, and Natal Colony. Various other colonies were invited to send representatives to the opening ceremonies but not participate as delegates. William A. Baillie-Hamilton, the private secretary to the secretary of state for the Colonies, acted as secretary to the conference. The delegates were only able to agree on the most general programs towards closer cooperation.

In his opening address, Lord Salisbury cited the importance of mutual defense but also maintained his opposition to the creation of a federation, deeming it impractical. He explained that attempts at constitution-making is not feasible because such imperial federation could not conduct its affairs from one center. Some colonies also threatened to boycott debates about such measure.

Nation	Name	Portfolio
United Kingdom	Sir Henry Thurston Holland	Secretary of State for the Colonies (President)
United Kingdom	Lord Salisbury	Prime Minister of the United Kingdom
United Kingdom	The Earl Cadogan	Lord Privy Seal
United Kingdom	W. H. Smith	First Lord of the Treasury
United Kingdom	Edward Stanhope	Secretary of State for War
United Kingdom	Lord George Hamilton	First Lord of the Admiralty
United Kingdom	The Viscount Cross	Secretary of State for India
United Kingdom	The Lord Stanley of Preston	President of the Board of Trade
United Kingdom	Henry Cecil Raikes	Postmaster-General
United Kingdom	The Earl of Onslow	Under-Secretary of State for the Colonies
United Kingdom	Sir James Fegusson	Under-Secretary of State for Foreign Affairs
Canada	Sir Alexander Campbell	former Canadian senator for Ontario
Canada	Sanford Fleming	engineer
(Dominion of Newfoundland) Newfoundland Colony	Sir Robert Thorburn	Premier
(Dominion of Newfoundland) Newfoundland Colony	Sir Ambrose Shea	Leader of the Opposition
Colony of New South Wales	Sir Patrick Jennings	former premier
Colony of New South Wales	Sir Robert Wisdom	former Attorney-General
Colony of New South Wales	Sir Saul Samuel	Agent-General
Colony of Tasmania	John Stokell Dodds	former Attorney-General
Colony of Tasmania	Adye Douglas	Agent-General
(British Cape Colony) Cape Colony	Jan Hendrik Hofmeyr	Member of the Cape House of Assembly
Colony of South Australia	Sir John Downer	Premier
Colony of South Australia	Sir Arthur Blyth	Agent-General
Colony of New Zealand	Sir Dillon Bell	Agent-General
Colony of New Zealand	Sir William Fitzherbert	Speaker of the New Zealand Legislative Council
(Victoria (state)) Colony of Victoria	Alfred Deakin	Chief Secretary
(Victoria (state)) Colony of Victoria	Sir James Lorimer	Minister of Defence
(Victoria (state)) Colony of Victoria	Sir Graham Berry	Agent-General
(Victoria (state)) Colony of Victoria	James Service	former premier of Victoria
Colony of Queensland	Sir Samuel Griffith	Premier
Colony of Queensland	Sir James Francis Garrick	Agent-General
Colony of Western Australia	John Forrest	Surveyor General and Commissioner of Crown Lands
Colony of Western Australia	Septimus Burt	former Attorney-General
Colony of Natal	John Robinson	Member of the Natal Legislative Council

== See also ==
- Imperial Conference
- All Red Line - the eventual network of telegraph cables connecting the British Empire.
