= Thomas Ekins Fuller =

Sir Thomas Ekins Fuller KCMG
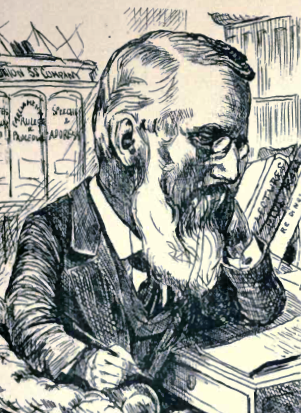
- Thomas Ekins Fuller, caricatured by WH Schroeder

Agent-General for Cape Colony
- In office 1 January 1902 – 1907
- Prime Minister: Sir Gordon Sprigg; Sir Leander Starr Jameson

Member of the Cape House of Assembly for Cape Town
- In office 1878–1902

Personal details
- Born: 24 August 1831 West Drayton, Middlesex, England
- Died: 5 September 1910 (aged 79) Tunbridge Wells, Kent, England
- Party: Progressive
- Education: Bristol Baptist College
- Occupation: Journalist, businessman, politician

Sir Thomas Ekins Fuller KCMG (1831–1910) was editor of the Cape Argus newspaper and a prominent Member of the Legislative Assembly of the Cape Colony. Initially a moderate follower of the "Cape Liberal Tradition", he advocated for responsible government (local democracy) in the 1860s as editor of the Cape Argus newspaper (1864–1873). He also supported the inclusive, locally oriented politics of his liberal allies at the time.

== Early life ==
Tulle was born in West Drayton, Middlesex, to Reverend Andrew Fuller and his wife Esther Hobson. Privately educated he would graduate from Bristol Baptist College. Becoming a Baptist pastor he would minister in Melksham, Lewis and Luton. During this time he married in 1855 and in addition to his pastoral work, contributed article to newspapers. In 1864, he would arrive in the Cape Colony, after a doctor advised that his wife's health would improve in that climate. Before leaving London, he met Saul Solomon, owner of the Cape Argus, and was offered a job as an editor of the latter in Cape Town.

== Cape Colony ==
He would edit the Cape Argus from 1864 until 1873. During his time at the paper, he advocated for responsible government of the Cape and for its own higher college of education which would much later evolve into the University of Cape Town. He left the Cape Colony in 1873 after his wife Mary died of tuberculosis a year earlier.

Between 1873 and 1875 he worked as an immigration agent for the Colony in London, before returning to the Cape with a new wife to become general manager of the Union Steamship Company (1875–1898). He became a member of the Legislative Assembly of the Cape Colony (MLA for Cape Town, from 1879 to 1900).

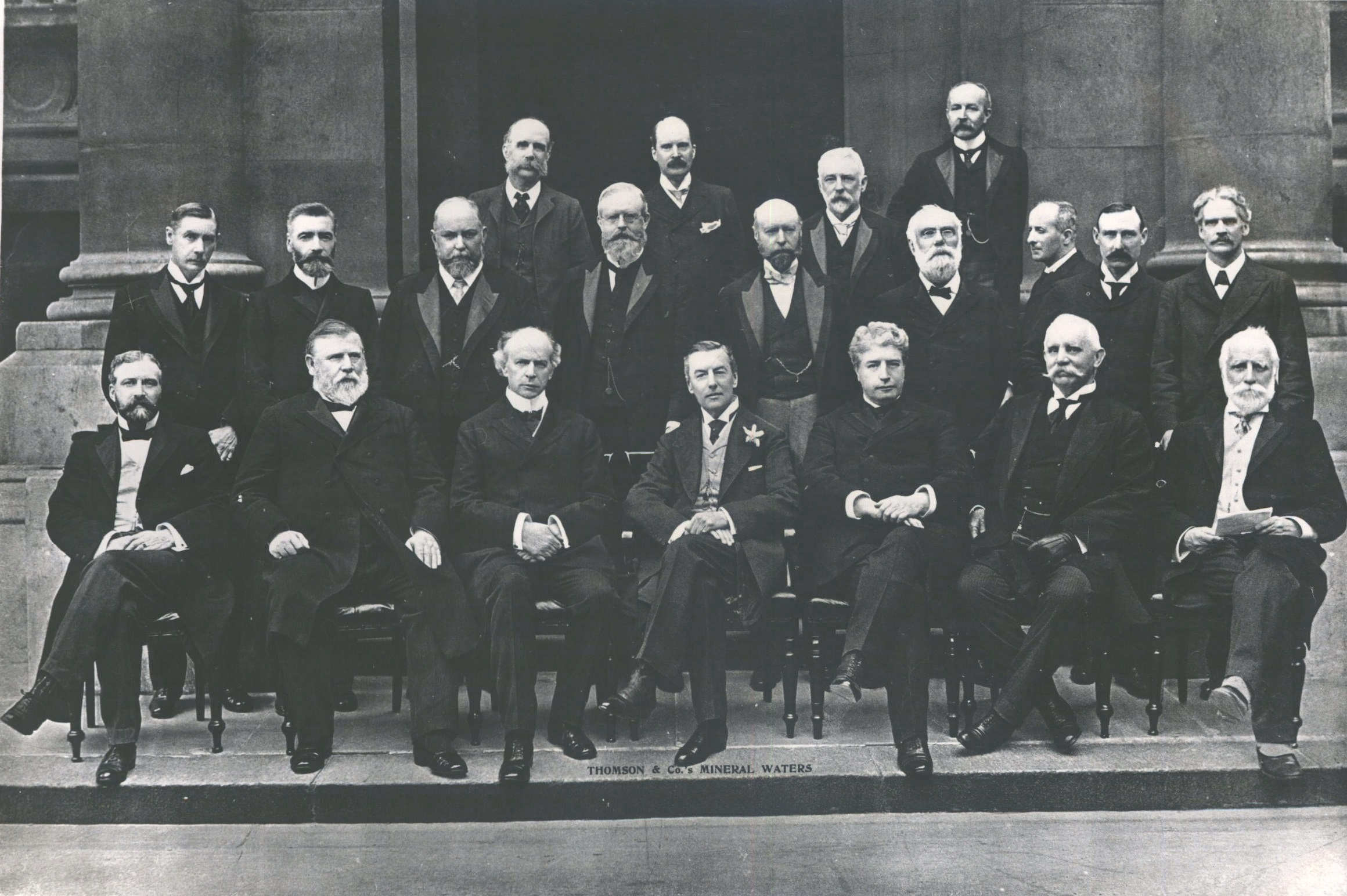
Fuller is visible on the far-right of the front row. He attended the 1902 Colonial Conference as Agent-General for the Cape.

Although initially a liberal, in later life, he came to be greatly influenced by the imperialist Cecil Rhodes, of whom he eventually became a devoted admirer. He would join Rhodes' Progressive Party in the colony. He was an advocate of residential racial segregation in Cape Town and legislated for a restricted franchise for non-white males in the colony. After the Jameson Raid, Fuller joined the South African League, established to highlight the grievances of the Uitlanders in the Transvaal Republic with the British government in London. Finally in 1898, he even became a director of the De Beers Consolidated Mines Company.

In 1902, he became the Cape Colony's agent-general in London until 1907. He was made a Companion of the Most Distinguished Order of St Michael and St George (CMG) in 1903. He was knighted in 1904.

== Married ==
He married Mary Playne Hillier, from Nailsworth, in 1855. Fuller married his second wife, Elizabeth Mann, in London in 1875.

== Death ==
He died on 5 September 1910 at Tunbridge Wells, Kent.
