= Imperial Federation League =

Organization in the 19th century that promoted the Imperial Federation

The Imperial Federation League was a 19th-century organisation which aimed to promote the reorganisation of the British Empire into an Imperial Federation, similarly to the way the majority of British North America confederated into the Dominion of Canada in the mid-19th century. The League promoted the closer union of the British Empire and advocated the establishment of "representative government" for the UK, Canada and the self-governing colonies of 'Australasia' (Australia and New Zealand) and Cape Colony (the future Union of South Africa) within a single sate.

== Formation ==
It was founded in London on 18 November 1884, as an initiative of W. E. Forster who would be its first chairman. The following resolutions were passed:

1. That a Society be now formed to be called “The Imperial Federation League.
2. That the object of the League be to secure by Federation the permanent Unity of the Empire.
3. That no scheme of Federation should interfere with the existing rights of local Parliaments as regards local affairs.
4. That any scheme of Imperial Federation should combine, on an equitable basis, the resources of the Empire for the maintenance of common interests and adequately provide for an organised defence of common rights.
5. That the League use every constitutional means to bring about the object for which it is formed and invite the support of men of all political parties.
6. That the membership of the League be open to any British subject who accepts the principles of the League, and pays a yearly registration fee of not less than one shilling.
7. That donations and subscriptions be invited for providing means for conducting the business of the League.
8. That British subjects throughout the Empire be invited to become members, and to form and organise Branches of the League which may place their representatives on the General Committee.

Branches were established in Canada, Australia, New Zealand, Barbados and British Guiana. After Forster's death Lord Rosebery became President of the League; he was in turn succeeded by Edward Stanhope.

Francis Labilliere, William Westgarth and John Dennistoun Wood served on a committee of six to draft the prospectus of the Imperial Federation League. It aimed to promote the Imperial Federation, to be formed in a similar way to the confederation of a majority of British North America into the Dominion of Canada in the mid-19th century. The United States and Canada were held up as concrete examples of how vast territories could be effectively managed while maintaining a central representative authority.

The League was cross-party and sought to avoid party politics. The Imperial Federation League combined politicians, journalists, and intellectuals, like Sir John Robert Seeley, James Bryce, Alfred Milner, Froude and Lord Tennyson.

=== Ontario/Canada ===
Whilst branches of the Imperial Federation League spread throughout the Empire, a large branch formed in Toronto in 1887. It was spurred on by a United States initiative for a commercial union between the US and Canada. Dalton McCarthy MP was a founder of the IFL. A Conservative MP initially, he ran a slate of McCarthyite candidates in the 1896 federal election on an anti-Catholic platform but was the only one elected.

Prominent Canadian members included Sir Charles Tupper, Sir Sam Hughes, and both G.T. Denison and his brother Frederick Charles Denison. George Robert Parkin would extensively tour the empire speaking on behalf of the cause.

The annexation crises of the late 1880s and early 1890s were a particular concern of the League.

=== Victoria/Australia ===
A branch of the League was established in Victoria in 1885.

Alfred Deakin was a supporter of the League and in 1905 became the President of the Victorian branch.

Partly through the efforts of Henry D'Esterre Taylor the Victorian branch survived the dissolution of the London branch.

The Victorian Branch was a supporter of the notion that Imperial Federation could be encouraged best by not enunciating a clear plan.

"Most of the supporters of Imperial Federation have hitherto indulged in very vague generalities. The Victorian branch of the league weds itself to no scheme, and will have nothing to do with ways and means to effect its object. … This promised land seems just a little indefinite."

Many in the Victorian branch regarded the Federation of Australia as the first step towards Imperial Federation.

== Programme ==
Supporters of Imperial Federation presented the argument that the two choices for Britain were federation or disintegration. In their view, the future importance of Britain depended on it federating what is now called the "Old Commonwealth".

The League promoted the closer union of the British Empire under an "Imperial Federal Government" however it did not settle on any particular scheme of what this would comprise, whether a Federal Parliament, a Council, or Conferences, other than that it would include representation from the parts of the empire to consider matters of foreign policy, defence, and trade. It was generally taken to mean some sort of Imperial Parliament.

The Imperial Parliament (Westminster, stripped of its local responsibilities) would handle foreign affairs, the army, the navy, and those colonies (including India) which had a population the bulk of which was "alien". The center would also have a final court of appeal. Local Parliaments would exercise control over Home Affairs, the police and education.

The League was Unionist in outlook.

The League was divided between those who wanted to establish a clear pathway for Imperial Federation and those whose view was that the program could best be advanced by general discussion, aiming to move opinion in favor of federation with specifics to be worked out later (Parkin, in Canada, argued that that was the method used to bring about Canadian Confederation).

Another point of division within the League was the question of free trade or tariff protection. The League while refraining from adopting a view point did not prevent advocates from either side commenting on the matter. A prominent activist in the League was the protectionist Howard Vincent MP.

A "want of homogeneity" in the League and recognition that it was composed of "three or four sections" would be given as the reason for the eventual dissolution of the League in 1893

The League's most notable opponents were Edward Augustus Freeman, Goldwin Smith, and Andrew Carnegie. In his Triumphant Democracy Carnegie would refer to the League as Rosebery's "amusing Imperial Federation fad (which, happily, is impossible)"

== Successes and Failures ==
The League brought the issue of imperial federation to the attention of the public throughout the empire.

It had a concrete accomplishment in the calling of the First Colonial Conference in 1887 at the time of Queen Victoria's golden jubilee.

The League sent deputations to two successive Prime Minister, Salisbury and Gladstone. While Salisbury agreed to the calling of the Colonial Conference he would later dismiss federation as nothing more than "a word spelt with ten letters". Gladstone, as a Little Englander, was predictably unresponsive and he "dismissed summarily the plan submitted for consideration by the IFL in April 1893"

== Post-Dissolution ==
The League was effectively revived by some members in 1894 as the British Empire League.

Milner would go on to unite South Africa and form the Round Table movement.
