= Balfour Declaration of 1926 =

Declaration of the equality of the Commonwealth nations

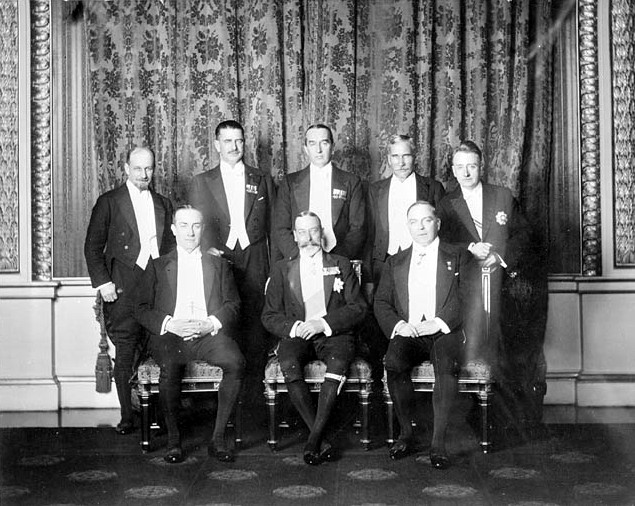
King George V (front, centre) with his prime ministers at the 1926 Imperial Conference. Standing (left to right): Monroe (Newfoundland), Coates (New Zealand), Bruce (Australia), Hertzog (South Africa), Cosgrave (Irish Free State). Seated: Baldwin (United Kingdom), King George V, King (Canada).

The Balfour Declaration of 1926, also called the Balfour Definition, was issued by the 1926 Imperial Conference of British Empire leaders in London. It was named after Arthur Balfour, who was Lord President of the Council. Found in the section of the conference proceedings entitled "Status of Great Britain and the Dominions", it stated:

There is, however, one most important element in it which, from a strictly constitutional point of view, has now, as regards all vital matters, reached its full development — we refer to the group of self-governing communities composed of Great Britain and the Dominions. Their position and mutual relation may be readily defined. They are autonomous Communities within the British Empire, equal in status, in no way subordinate one to another in any aspect of their domestic or external affairs, though united by a common allegiance to the Crown, and freely associated as members of the British Commonwealth of Nations.

== Background ==
The Imperial War Conference of 1917 passed a resolution drafted by Canadian prime minister Robert Borden, which described the Dominions as "autonomous nations within an Imperial Commonwealth" possessed of a right to "an adequate voice in foreign policy and in foreign relations". The resolution also called for a "constitutional conference" to be convened following the end of the war to determine a "re-adjustment of the constitutional relations of the component parts of the Empire".

At the Paris Peace Conference of 1919, the Dominions sent separate representatives that were deemed for negotiation purposes to form part of one British Empire delegation. They signed the Treaty of Versailles under that designation but were admitted as separate members of the League of Nations. The confusion over the status of Dominions within the international community prompted calls for a formal statement of their relationship with the United Kingdom.

== Preparation ==
The Inter-Imperial Relations Committee, chaired by Balfour, drew up the document preparatory to its unanimous approval by the imperial prime ministers on 15 November 1926. It was first proposed by South African Prime Minister J. B. M. Hertzog and Canadian Prime Minister William Lyon Mackenzie King.

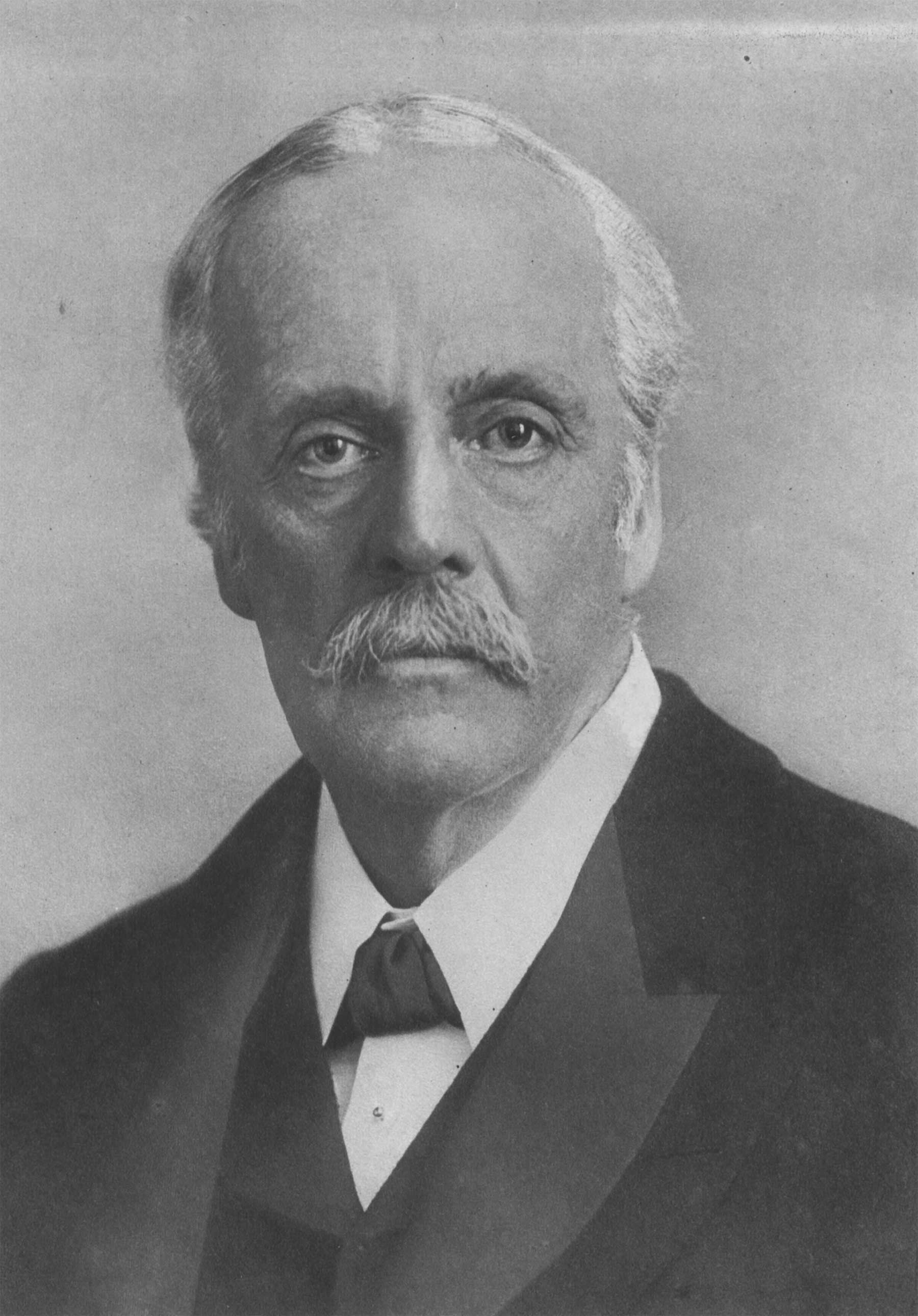
Arthur Balfour, Earl of Balfour

The wording of the declaration was drafted by Balfour following two weeks of discussion with prime ministers and heads of delegations, with Hertzog, Colonial Secretary Leo Amery, and Secretary of State for India Lord Birkenhead playing key roles.

== Provisions ==
The declaration accepted the growing political and diplomatic independence of the Dominions in the years after World War I. It also recommended that the governors-general, the representatives of the King in each dominion, should no longer also serve automatically as the representative of the British government in diplomatic relations between the countries. In following years, high commissioners were gradually appointed, whose duties were soon recognised to be virtually identical to those of an ambassador. The first such British high commissioner was appointed to Canada in 1928.

== Subsequent developments ==
The conclusions of the Imperial Conference of 1926 were re-stated by the 1930 conference and incorporated in the Statute of Westminster of December 1931. In the statute, the British Parliament provided that it would not enact a law which applied to a Dominion as part of the law of that Dominion, unless the law expressly stated that the Dominion government had requested and consented to the enactment of that law.

== Sources ==
- Hall, H. Duncan (1962). "The genesis of the Balfour declaration of 1926". Journal of Commonwealth Political Studies. 1 (3): 169–193. doi:10.1080/14662046208446970.
