= Imperial Preference =

Tariff reductions within the British Empire and Commonwealth

Imperial Preference was a system of mutual tariff reduction enacted throughout the British Empire following the Ottawa Conference of 1932. As Commonwealth Preference, the proposal was later revived in regard to the members of the Commonwealth of Nations.

Joseph Chamberlain, the powerful colonial secretary from 1895 until 1903, argued vigorously that Britain could compete with its growing industrial rivals (chiefly the United States and Germany) and thus maintain Great Power status. The best way to do so would be to enhance internal trade inside the worldwide British Empire, with emphasis on the more developed countries — Australia, Canada, New Zealand and South Africa — that had attracted large numbers of British settlers.

== Pre-20th century ==
In 1660, the practice of "Old Subsidy" gave certain imported colonial products a virtual monopoly in England, effectively starting a form of colonial preference for sugar. By 1840, this had been extended such that more than eighty commercial goods were protected, as the Corn Laws protected some colonial agricultural goods. Colonial conferences held throughout the late 19th century arranged closer economic unions between Dominions and the mother country, with the Dominions giving preferences in exchange for defence commitments or common commercial, patent, immigration and shipping policies.

== 20th century ==
In the late 1800s and especially during the early 1900s, Imperial Preference was considered a method of promoting unity within the British Empire and sustaining Britain's position as a global power as a response to increased competition from the protectionist Germany and United States.

The idea was associated particularly with Joseph Chamberlain, who resigned from the government of Arthur Balfour in September 1903 in order to be free to campaign for Tariff Reform. Among those opposing Chamberlain was the Chancellor of the Exchequer, Charles Thomson Ritchie, who, guided by the free-trade ideas of the leading economists of the time, such as Sir William Ashley, was vigorously opposed to any scheme of Imperial Preference. This ultimately resulted in a damaging rift within Balfour's Conservative–Unionist coalition government, contributing to its defeat in the 1906 elections.

During the 1920s, Imperial Preference became popular once more, mostly through the good will of Lord Beaverbrook and his Daily Express, once Lloyd George was ejected from office. Unfortunately for Beaverbrook, Bonar Law preferred Lord Derby and his fear of opposition to a policy of extra-mural Food Tax, and Beaverbrook was unable to adapt his scheme, perhaps because of the economics:

For at that time there could be no advantage to the Dominions unless Empire food was admitted to Britain tax free—and Britain imported more than half of her consumption of food.

Law died in office before his first year in power was complete, and was succeeded by Stanley Baldwin, who was a tepid supporter of the scheme. He called the 1923 elections specifically to introduce protectionist policies and lost, leading to the first minority Labour government. Baldwin's Conservatives came back to power after the 1924 elections without a protectionist policy. His Colonial and Dominions Secretary, Leo Amery, was one of its strongest supporters and in 1926 established the Empire Marketing Board to encourage Britons to 'buy Empire'. But Winston Churchill, Chancellor of the Exchequer of the Baldwin government, a former Liberal and always a no-holds-barred free trader, was an opponent. Public opposition to protectionism contributed to the Conservative loss of power again in the 1929 elections and the creation of the second Labour government.

The 1931 elections supported a National Government nominally led by former Labour prime minister Ramsay MacDonald but with an overwhelming majority of MPs being Conservatives under Baldwin; these largely supported Imperial Preference as a response to the Great Depression. In 1932, representatives of Britain, the Dominions, and the Colonies held the Commonwealth Conference on Economic Consultation and Co-operation in Ottawa, Ontario, Canada. They agreed to implement policies of Imperial Preference for five years. This new policy was based on the principle of "home producers first, empire producers second, and foreign producers last"

In 1935, the Canadian Prime Minister, R. B. Bennett, a Conservative endorsed Imperial Preference.

After World War II and the signing of the General Agreement on Tariffs and Trade in 1947, the extension of preferential tariffs was prohibited and the margins reduced. Inflation, combined with the general liberalisation of trade around the world, ended the formal system of imperial preference. Also the decision of the United Kingdom to seek membership to the European Communities in the late 1950s and 1960s which would later become the European Union would also play a pivotal part in the end of imperial preference as membership to the EC meant Britain having to prioritise its trade links with its fellow EC member states and the application of the Common External Tariff within the UK having to apply to all goods coming in from outside the EC including from Commonwealth countries. The United Kingdom after some twelve years of negotiations would become a EC member state on 1 January 1973.

== 21st century ==
Brexit has sparked increased interest in forming trade agreements between the United Kingdom and the Commonwealth.

== Preference in other countries ==
The Italian Empire, Spain, Portugal, France, Japan, and the United States all had varying degrees of preference between their mainland and their colonies.

== See also ==
- Commonwealth free trade
- CANZUK
- Imperial Federation
- Import Duties Act 1932
- Tariff Reform League

== Bibliography ==
- Glickman, David L. "The British imperial preference system." Quarterly Journal of Economics 61.3 (1947): 439-470. online
- Lord Beaverbrook (1963). The Decline and Fall of Lloyd George. London: Collins.
- McKenzie, Francine. Redefining the bonds of Commonwealth, 1939–1948: the politics of preference (Springer, 2002).
- Tsokhas, Kosmas. "Protection, imperial preference, and Australian conservative politics, 1923–39." Journal of Imperial and Commonwealth History 20.1 (1992): 65-87.
