= British Empire Economic Conference =

1932 meeting in Ottawa, Canada

1932 British Empire Economic Conference Imperial Economic Conference
- Host country: Canada
- Date: 21 July 1932– 18 August 1932
- Cities: Ottawa
- Venues: House of Commons chamber, Parliament Hill
- Participants: 9
- Chair: R. B. Bennett (Canadian Prime Minister)
- Follows: 1930
- Precedes: 1937

Key points
- Imperial preference, tariffs, monetary standards

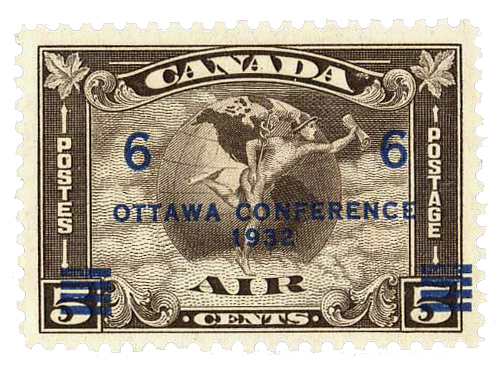
Postage stamp, Canada, 1932: commemorative overprint for Ottawa Conference.

The British Empire Economic Conference (also known as the Imperial Economic Conference or Ottawa Conference) was a 1932 conference of British colonies and dominions held to discuss the Great Depression. It was held between 21 July and 20 August in Ottawa.

The conference saw the group admit the failure of the gold standard and abandon attempts to return to it. The meeting also worked to establish a zone of limited tariffs within the British Empire, but with high tariffs with the rest of the world. This was called "Imperial preference" or "Empire Free-Trade" on the principle of "home producers first, empire producers second, and foreign producers last". The result of the conference was a series of bilateral agreements that would last for at least 5 years. This abandonment of open free trade led to a split in the British National Government coalition: the Official Liberals under Herbert Samuel left the Government, but the National Liberals under Sir John Simon remained.

The conference was especially notable for its adoption of Keynesian ideas such as lowering interest rates, increasing the money supply, and expanding government spending.

According to a 2024 study, the impact of the agreement on Canada was limited, as Canada already had a highly protectionist trade policy.

== Heads of delegations ==
The conference was hosted by the Governor General of Canada, The Earl of Bessborough, representing King George V and included the Prime Ministers and other leaders of the Empire and members of their respective cabinets:

Nation	Name	Portfolio
Canada	R. B. Bennett	Prime Minister (Chairman)
Australia	Stanley Bruce	Assistant Treasurer of Australia
India	Sir Atul Chandra Chatterjee	Viceroy's representative
Irish Free State	Seán T. O'Kelly	Vice-President
(Dominion of Newfoundland) Newfoundland	Frederick C. Alderdice	Prime Minister
New Zealand	Gordon Coates	Minister of Public Works, Minister in charge of Unemployment
Southern Rhodesia	Howard Unwin Moffat	Prime Minister
South Africa	Nicolaas Havenga	Finance Minister
United Kingdom	Stanley Baldwin	Lord President of the Council

== See also ==
- Import Duties Act 1932
- Imperial Conference

== Sources ==
- British Empire Economic Conference, Time magazine, 25 July 1932
- Barry Eichengreen and Douglas A. Irwin, "Trade blocs, currency blocs and the reorientation of world trade in the 1930s", Journal of International Economics, Volume 38, Issues 1–2, February 1995, Pages 1–24
- Robert A. MacKay, "Imperial Economics at Ottawa", Pacific Affairs, Vol. 5, No. 10 (Oct. 1932), pp. 873–885
- Maxwell Slutz Stewart, The Ottawa conference, Foreign Policy Association, incorporated, 1932
- "Imperial Economic Conference, Ottawa, 1932. Summary of Proceedings". Journals of the House of Representatives. Session I-II Appendix, A-06. New Zealand. 1932.
- Potter, Pitman B. (1932). "The British Imperial Economic Conference". American Journal of International Law. 26 (4): 811–813.
