= King-emperor =

Sovereign title

Signature of King-Emperor George V, King of the United Kingdom and the British Dominions, and Emperor of India (1910–1936). The 'R' and 'I' after his name indicate 'King' and 'Emperor' in Latin ('Rex' and 'Imperator').

A king-emperor or queen-empress is a sovereign ruler who is simultaneously a king or queen of one polity and emperor or empress of another. This dual title usually results from merger of one royal and one imperial crown (ruling office), but recognises the two polities as politically distinct and their supreme magistracies, i. e., political offices, as different in form. It also denotes the imperial status of a king who holds it by virtue of acquisition of an empire or vice versa.

The dual title may signify that the sovereign holds two political offices that differ in form, one in each polity subject to him, but it also may have been instituted merely to augment the prestige of the sovereign. Both instances, however, signify that the union of the two supreme political magistracies into one officeholder, i. e., sovereign, is not by virtue of annexation, in which one polity was amalgamated into another, yet rather of unification and almost equal status, though in the instance of the British monarchy the suggestion that the office of emperor was superior to that of king was avoided by instituting the title "king-emperor" ("queen-empress") instead of "emperor-king" ("empress-queen").

== In former Austria-Hungary ==
Another use of this dual title was in 1867, when the multi-national Austrian Empire, which was German-ruled and faced growing nationalism, undertook a reform that gave nominal and actual rights to Hungarian nobility. This reform revived the Austrian-annexed Kingdom of Hungary, and therefore instituted the dual-monarchic real union polity of Austria-Hungary and the dual title of "emperor-king" (in German Kaiser und König, in Hungarian Császár és Király).

The Habsburg dynasty therefore ruled as emperors of Austria the western and northern half of the Empire (Cisleithania) and as kings of Hungary the Kingdom of Hungary and much of Transleithania. Hungary enjoyed some degree of self-government and representation in joint affairs, principally foreign relations and defence. The full title of the federation was "The Kingdoms and Lands Represented in the Imperial Council and the Lands of the Crown of Saint Stephen".

== In the Italian colonial empire ==
Following the reorganization of the Ethiopian Empire into Italian Ethiopia in 1936, King Victor Emmanuel III was proclaimed emperor of Ethiopia. Thus, he became the king-emperor (in Italian Re Imperatore), ruling both the Kingdom of Italy and the Ethiopian Empire. The king-emperor was represented by the viceroy, who was also appointed as governor-general of Italian East Africa (Africa Orientale Italiana (AOI)).

== In the German Empire ==
In 1871, the North German Confederation united with the Southern German states to form the German Empire. Its constitution stated that the king of Prussia, then William I, would be crowned German emperor (Deutscher Kaiser). William wanted to be proclaimed emperor of Germany (Kaiser von Deutschland), but this would have caused a problem regarding sovereignty with the southern German princes and also with Austria.

After the devastating loss in the First World War and the German Revolution, Emperor William II attempted to abdicate the throne of Germany while retaining the kingship of Prussia, believing the Kingdom of Prussia and the German Empire to be in a personal union. But after being informed that he could not abdicate only one of these offices, he abdicated both and lived the remainder of his life in exile in the Netherlands.

== In the British Empire ==
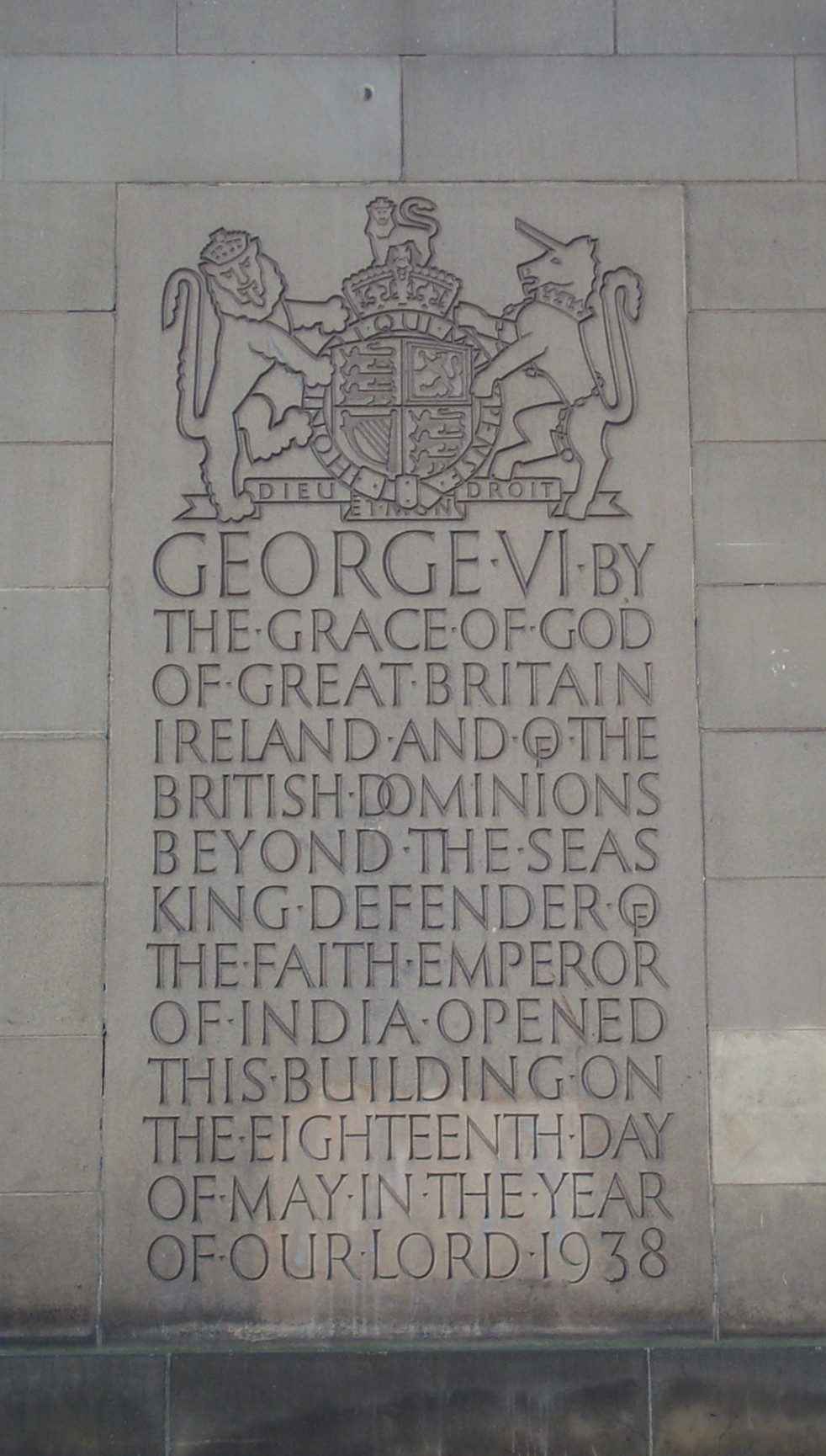
A plaque on the Manchester Town Hall Extension records King George VI's titles while he was Emperor of India.

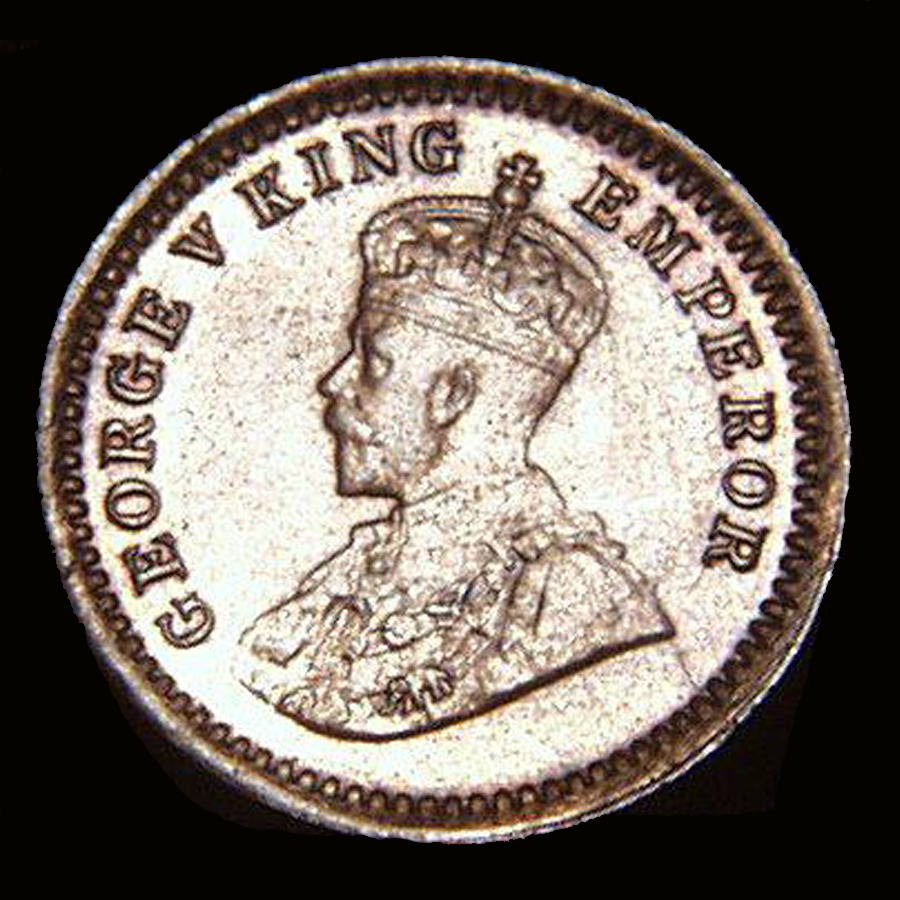
Indian coins during the British Raj featured the title "King Emperor", such as this coin depicting George V.

The British Crown had officially assumed government of British India from the East India Company in 1858 in the aftermath of what the British called the "Indian Mutiny". Henceforth, India, including British India and the Princely States, was ruled directly from Whitehall in London via the India Office. In 1876, Queen Victoria was recognized as empress of India by the British Government via the Royal Titles Act 1876; this title was proclaimed in India at the Delhi Durbar of 1877. She was thus the queen-empress, and her successors, until George VI, were king-emperors. This title was the shortened form of the full title and in widespread popular use.

The reigning king-emperors or queen-empress used the initials R I (Rex Imperator or Regina Imperatrix) or the abbreviation Ind. Imp. (Indiae Imperator/Imperatrix) after their name; while the one reigning queen-empress, Victoria, used the initials R I, the three consorts of the married king-emperors simply used R.

British coins, and those of the British Empire and Commonwealth dominions, routinely included some variation of the titles Rex Ind. Imp., although in India itself the coins were inscribed "Empress" and later "King Emperor". When, in August 1947, India became independent, all mint dies had to be changed to remove the latter two abbreviations, in some cases taking up to a year. In the United Kingdom, coins of King George VI carried the title until 1948.

== Titles ==
- When the Goryeo dynasty, Koreans sometimes referred to their kings as the "holy emperor-king" (Korean: 신성제왕; Hanja: 神聖帝王).
- The Serbian emperor Stefan Dušan (r. 1346–55), who started as king (1331–46), was attested with the title "emperor of Greece and King of All Serb Lands and the Maritime" in a document dating between 1347 and 1356 (see also Emperor of the Serbs).
- The Holy Roman emperors were also kings of Bohemia, Burgundy, Germany, Hungary, or Italy for most of the time that title existed. Those territories were an integral part of the HRE. Still, an exception was the case of Charles V, who was HRE emperor and at the same time king of Spain (and with it, the Spanish Empire, which despite its name didn't have an emperor per se), hence receiving the title of king-emperor (rey emperador), as Charles I of Spain and V of the Holy Roman Empire.
- Napoleon was simultaneously emperor of the French and king of Italy. His title was shortened to "emperor-king" (Empereur-Roi or l'Empereur et Roi) rather than "king-emperor".
- John VI of Portugal was made titular emperor of Brazil along with being king of Portugal and was titled "king-emperor" until his death. Afterward his son Pedro briefly succeeded him as king of Portugal while reigning as emperor of Brazil.

== See also ==
- Kaiserlich und königlich
- King-Grand Duke
- Emperor at home, king abroad
