= Timeline of ornithology =

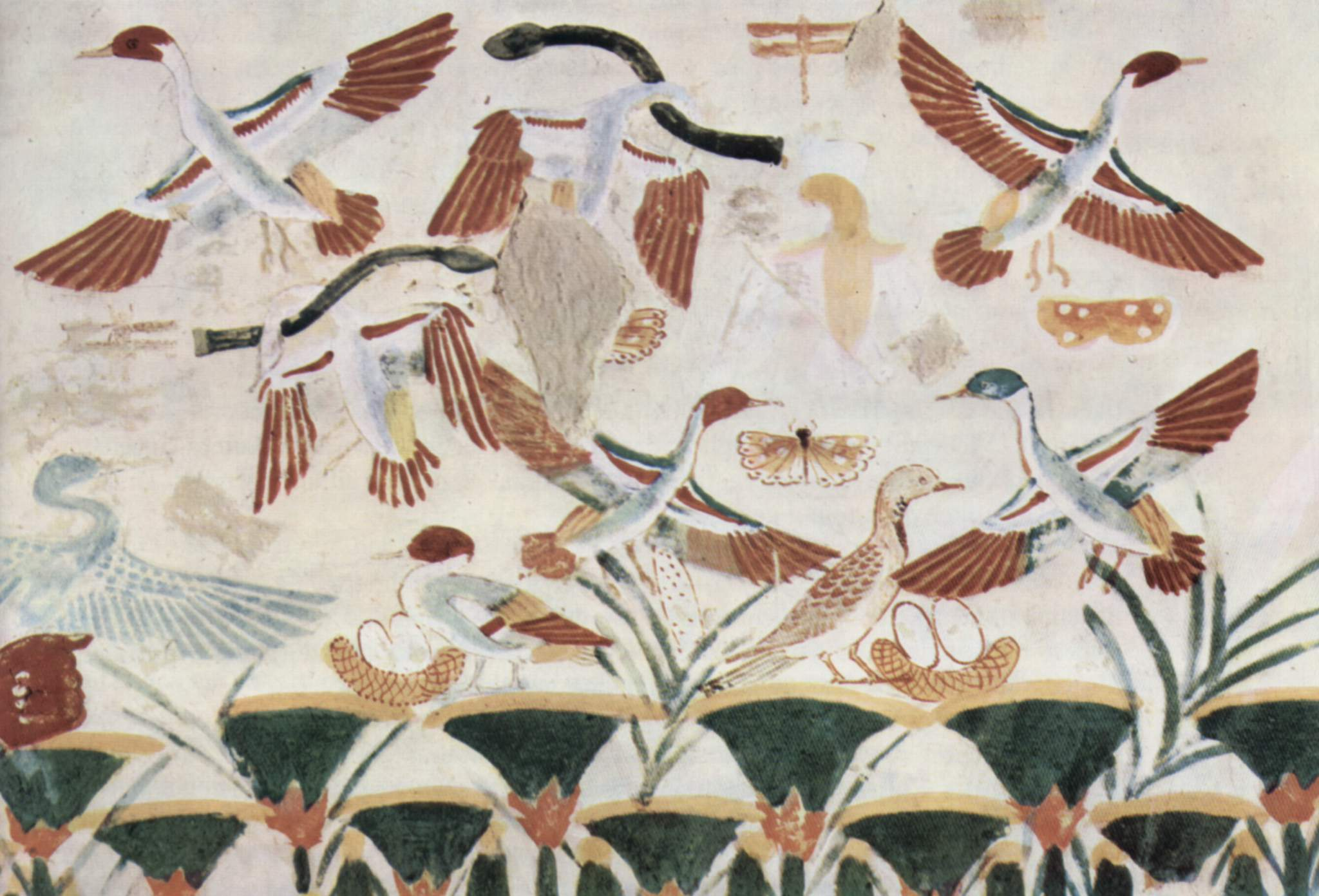
Egyptian marshland hunting scene 1422–1411 BC

The following is a timeline of ornithology events:

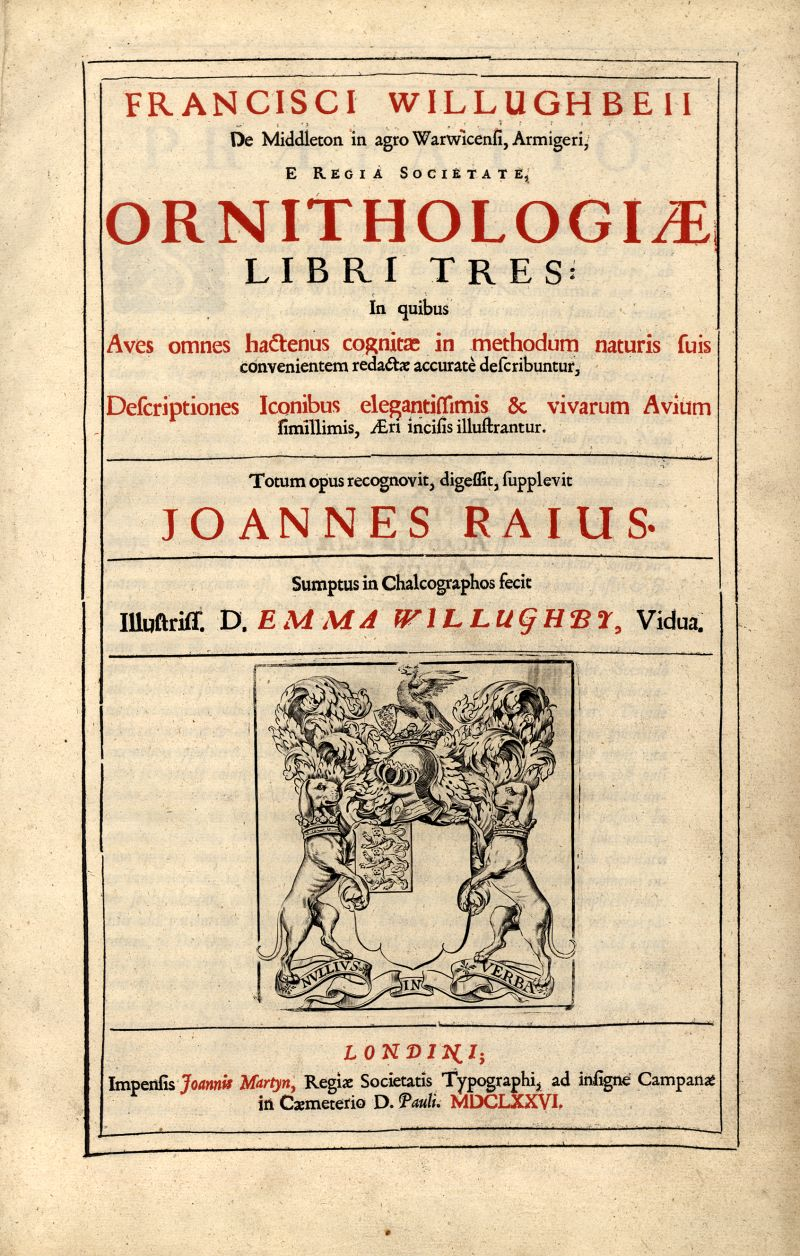
Francis Willughbys Ornithologia. This work is considered to be the beginning of scientific ornithology in Europe, and which revolutionized ornithology, by organizing species according to their physical characteristics.

== Until 1700 ==
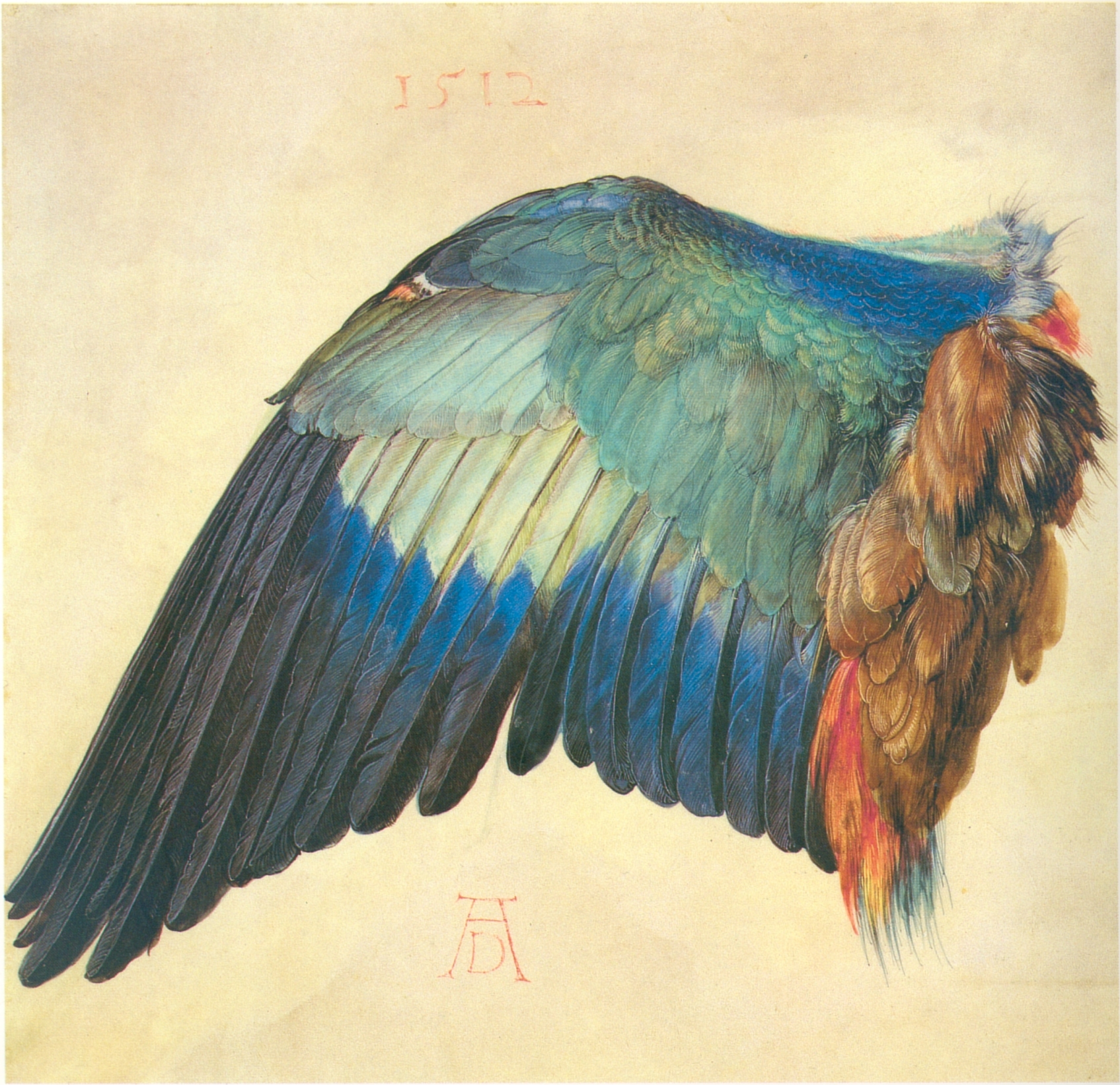
Wing of a European Roller, Albrecht Dürer, 1512

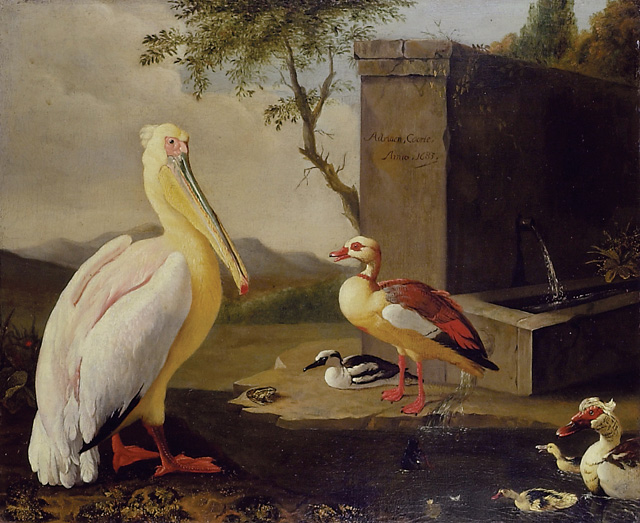
"Oriental Birds" Adriaen Coorte, 1683

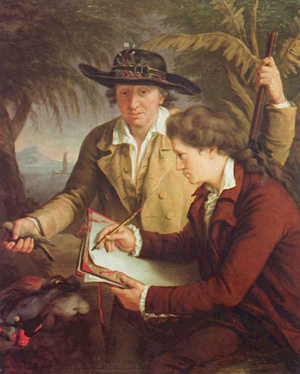
Johann Reinhold Forster and Georg Forster in Tahiti, by John Francis Rigaud (1742–1810), 1780

- 1500–800 BC – The Vedas mention the habit of brood parasitism in the Asian koel (Eudynamys scolopaceus).
- 4th century BC – Aristotle mentions over 170 sorts of birds in his work on animals. He recognises eight principal groups.
- 3rd century BC – The Erya, a Chinese encyclopedia comprising glosses on passages in ancient texts, notably the Book of Songs, features 79 entries in its chapter "Describing Birds"
- 1st century AD – Pliny the Elder's Historia Naturalis Book X is devoted to birds. Three groups based on characteristics of feet
- 2nd century AD – Aelian mentions a number of birds in his work on animals. Birds are listed alphabetically
- 1037 – Death of Abu ‘Ali al-Husayn ibn Abd Allah ibn Sina (known as Avicenna in Latin) author of Abbreviatio de animalibus, a homage to Aristotle
- c 1100 Hugh of Fouilloy authors De avibus, a moral treatise on birds later incorporated into many versions of the popular medieval bestiary.
- 1220 – Books on birds and other animals by Aristotle and Avicenna translated into Latin for the first time by Michael Scot
- 1250 – Death of Frederick II von Hohenstaufen, Holy Roman Emperor, and author of De arte venandi cum avibus ("concerning the art of hunting with birds") that describes the first manipulative experiments in ornithology and the methods of falconry
- 1478 – De Animalibus by Albertus Magnus is printed, which mentions many bird names. It had been written between 1260 and 1280.
- 1485 – First dated copy of Ortus sanitatis by Johannes de Cuba
- 1544 – William Turner prints a commentary on the birds mentioned by Aristotle and Pliny.
- 1555 – Conrad Gessner's Historic Animalium qui est de Auium natura and Pierre Belon's (Bellonius) Histoire de la nature des Oyseaux. Belon lists birds according to a definite system.
- 1573 – Volcher Coiter publishes his first treatise on bird anatomy
- 1591 – Joris Hoefnagel starts to work for Rudolf II, Holy Roman Emperor and produces for him 90 oil-base paintings, of which one is of the dodo.
- 1596 – The Compendium of Chinese Materia Medica by Li Shizhen includes a total of 77 species of bird.
- 1599 – Beginning of the publication of the works of Ulisse Aldrovandi on birds.
- 1603 – Caspar Schwenckfeld publishes the first regional fauna of Europe: Therio-tropheum Silesiae.
- 1605 – Clusius publishes Exoticorum libri decem ("Ten books of exotics") in which he describes many new exotic species.
- 1609 – The illustrated Sancai Tuhui, a Chinese encyclopedia by Wang Qi & Wang Siyi, lists a total of 113 species of bird.
- 1638 – Georg Marcgraf begins a voyage to Brazil where he studies the fauna and flora.
- 1652 – Leopoldina founded in the Holy Roman Empire. It is the oldest continuously existing learned society in the world.
- 1655 – Ole Worm collects a famous cabinet of curiosities whose illustrated inventory appears in 1655, Museum Wormianum. This collection comprises many birds but the techniques of conservation are not successful and they are quickly destroyed by insects.
- 1657 – Publication of Historiae naturalis de avibus by John Jonston.
- 1667 – Christopher Merrett publishes the first fauna of Great Britain, followed two years later by that of Walter Charleton.
- 1676 – Publication of Francis Willughby's Ornithologia by his collaborator John Ray. This is considered the beginning of scientific ornithology in Europe, revolutionizing ornithological taxonomy by organizing species according to their physical characteristics.
- 1681 – The last dodo dies on the island of Mauritius

== 18th century ==
- 1702 – Ferdinand Johann Adam von Pernau publishes a popular pioneering essay on bird behaviour.
- 1710 – Osservatorio Ornitologico di Arosio established
- 1713 – Death of the collector Johan de la Faille
- 1715 – Levinus Vincent publishes Wondertooneel der Nature the Wonder Theater of Nature
- 1716 – Peter the Great purchases the natural history collection of Albertus Seba
- 1724–1726 – François Valentijn and George Eberhard Rumpf give the first accounts of birds-of-paradise in Oud en Nieuw Oost-Indiën ("Old and New East India")
- 1729–1747 – Mark Catesby publishes his The Natural History of Carolina, Florida and the Bahama Islands which included 220 plates of birds, reptiles, amphibians, fish, insects, mammals and plants.
- 1731–1738 Eleazar Albin publishes A Natural History of Birds.
- 1733 – Great Northern Expedition leaves Saint Petersburg
- 1735 – Carl Linnaeus publishes his Systema Naturae. The classification of birds follows that of Ray
- 1737 – Giuseppe Ginanni writes the first book entirely devoted to the eggs and nests of birds, Dell Uova Nidi e dei degli Uccelli published in Venice
- 1741 – Georg Steller studies the birds of the north Pacific on his voyage with Vitus Bering
- 1742–1743 – Johann Heinrich Zorn publishes Petino-Theologie oder Versuch, Die Menschen durch nähere Betrachtung Der Vögel Zur Bewunderung Liebe und Verehrung ihres mächtigsten, weissest- und gütigsten Schöpffers aufzumuntern. Ornithotheology, or an encouragement to humanity, through a careful observation of birds, towards admiration, love and respect for their powerful, of the wise and good Creator.
- 1743 – George Edwards begins publication of his bird plates.
- 1754 – Jean-Louis Alléon-Dulac publishes Mélange d'histoire naturelle
- 1756 – Wilhelm Heinrich Kramer publishes in Elenchus Vegetabilium et Animalium per Austriam inferiorem Observatorum
- 1756 – Louis Daniel Arnault de Nobleville publishes Histoire naturelle des animaux
- 1757 – Michel Adanson publishes Histoire naturelle du Senegal.
- 1758 – Carl Linnaeus publishes the first volume of the 10th edition of his Systema Naturae, the first application of binomial nomenclature to birds.
- 1759–1771 – Peter Ascanius Icones rerum naturalium
- 1760 – Mathurin Jacques Brisson's six-volume Ornithologie improves upon Linnaeus' classification.

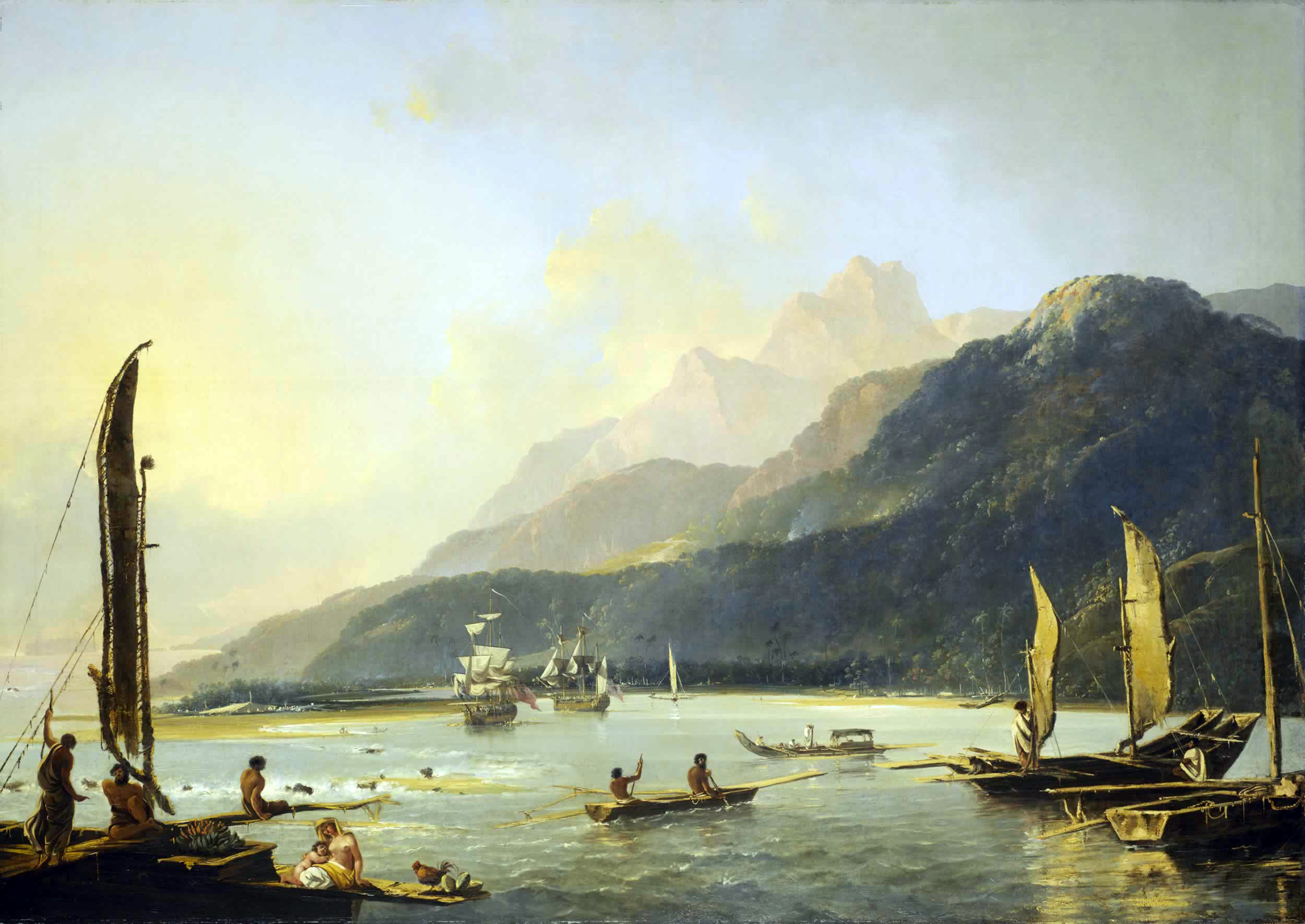
James Cook's second voyage of exploration in the Pacific. The Resolution and Adventure with fishing craft in Matavai Bay, Tahiti.

- 1763 – Erik Pontoppidan begins Den Danske atlas eller Konge-Riget Dannemark
- 1765 – Edme-Louis Daubenton engaged by Georges-Louis Leclerc, Comte de Buffon to supervise the illustration of his Histoire naturelle
- 1766 – Publication of the 12th edition of Carl Linnaeus's Systema Naturae. This was the last edition published in Linnaeus's lifetime. It included the binomial names for 931 bird species.
- 1766–1769 French naturalist Philibert Commerçon accompanies Louis Antoine de Bougainville on a voyage of circumnavigation
- 1768–1780 – Voyages of James Cook to the Pacific and Australia during which many birds new to science are collected by Joseph Banks and Johann Reinhold Forster
- 1768 Ivan Lepyokhin explores the Volga region
- 1770–1783 – Buffon's Histoire Naturelle des Oiseaux was the first work to take into account the geographical distribution of birds
- 1770 – Cornelius Nozeman begins work on Nederlandsche Vogelen
- 1774 – Jacob Christian Schäffer divides the birds into two families, Palmipedes (web-footed) and the much larger family Nudipedes (not web-footed) in Elementa Ornithologica.
- 1775 – Ashton Lever begins exhibiting his bird collection at a public museum called the Holophusikon
- 1776 – Francesco Cetti publishes Uccelli di Sardegna.
- 1776 – Saverio Manetti publishes the monumental Storia naturale degli uccelli
- 1776 – Philipp Ludwig Statius Müller publishes Des Ritters Carl von Linné Königlich Schwedischen Leibarztes ....
- 1776 – Peter Brown publishes New illustrations of Zoology.
- 1778 – Juan Ignacio Molina publishes Saggio sulla storia naturale del Chile which includes the first descriptions of many South American species
- 1778–1785 Félix Vicq-d'Azyr begins Mémoires pour servir à l'anatomie des oiseaux in Mémoires de l'Académie Royale des Sciences
- 1779–1780 Johann Friedrich Blumenbach Handbuch der Naturgeschichte; 12 editions and some translations. Published first in Göttingen by J. C. Dieterich
- 1780 Lazzaro Spallanzani Dissertationi di fisica animale e vegetale published. It includes investigations into bird physiology.
- 1782 – Pierre Joseph Buchoz Les dons merveilleux et diversement coloriés de la nature dans le règne animal, ou collection d’animaux précieusement coloriés (Paris : chez l'auteur)
- 1782 – Charles Joseph Panckoucke begins a publishing venture the Encyclopédie Méthodique
- 1782 – Johann Friedrich Blumenbach publishes Handbuch der Naturgeschichte
- 1784 – Teyler's Museum founded
- 1784 – Joseph Franz von Jacquin Beyträge zur Geschichte der Vögel
- 1785 – John Latham completes his Synopsis of Birds, which describes many birds collected in Australia and the Pacific Ocean. Thomas Pennant publishes Arctic Zoology.
- 1786–1789 – Anders Erikson Sparrman publishes Catalogue of the Museum Carlsonianum in which he described many of the specimens he had collected in South Africa and the South Pacific, some of which were new to science. In 1806 he published an Ornithology of Sweden
- 1787 – Carl Peter Thunberg publishes Museum naturalium Academiæ Upsaliensis
- 1786–1789 – Giovanni Antonio Scopoli describes birds collected by Pierre Sonnerat on his voyages. One is the black lory
- 1788 – Johann Friedrich Gmelin commences work on the 13th edition of Systema Naturae which includes the classification of many birds for the first time, especially those described by Latham
- 1788 – “de Arte Venandi cum Avibus” by Frederick II (d. 1250) published and compared favorably to contemporary science by Blasius Merrem and Johan Gottlobb Schneider
- 1789 – Publication of Gilbert White's Natural History and Antiquities of Selborne.
- 1789–1813 – George Shaw commences The Naturalist's Miscellany or Coloured Figures Of Natural Objects; Drawn and Described Immediately From Nature

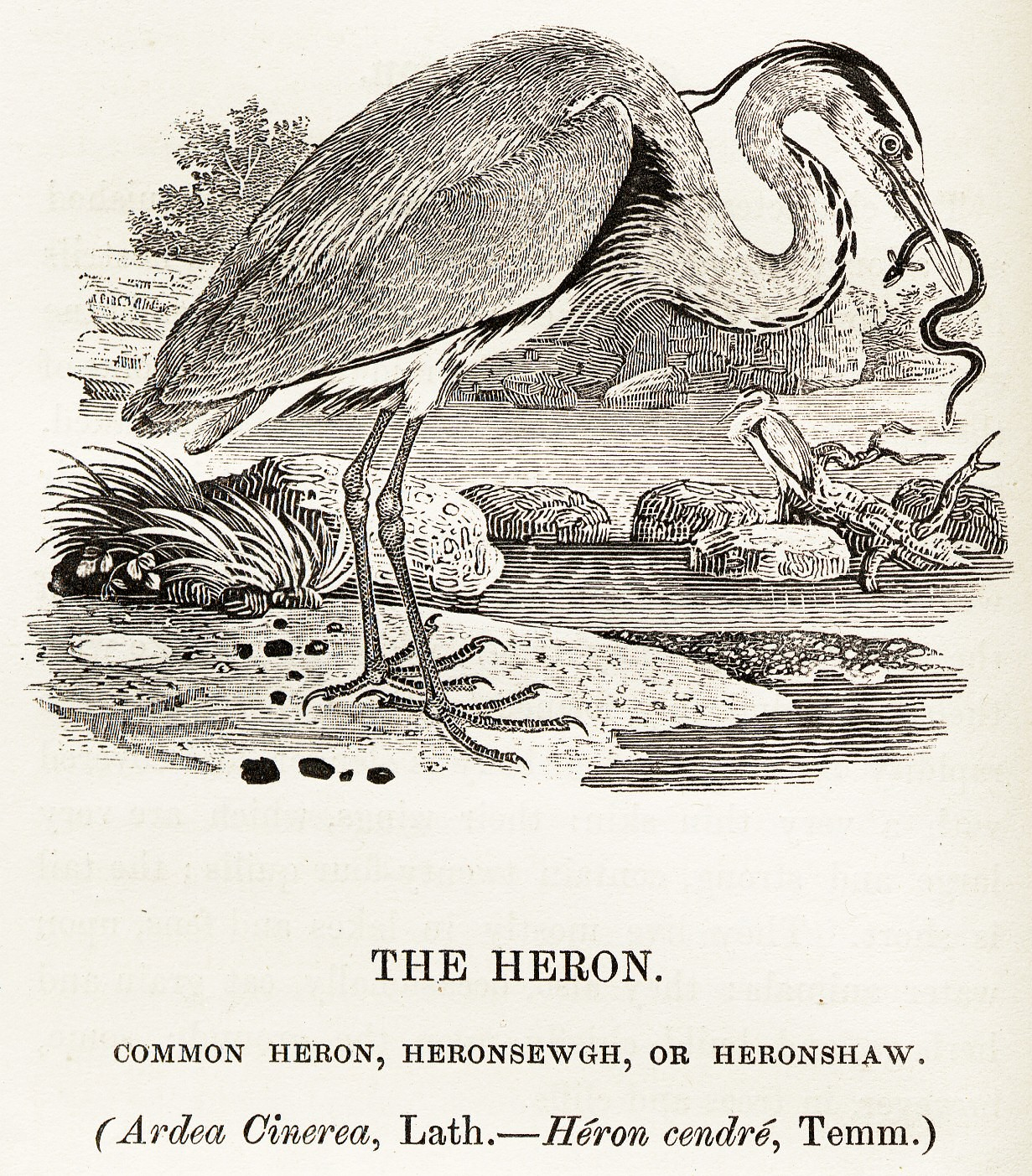
Heron wood engraving in Thomas Bewick's A History of British Birds

- 1790–1791 – Pierre Joseph Bonnaterre writes Tableau encyclopédique et méthodique des trois règnes de la nature, Ornithologie in Tableau encyclopédique et méthodique.
- Joachim Johann Nepomuk Spalowsky – Beytrag zur Naturgeschichte der Vögel
- 1793 Friedrich Albrecht Anton Meyer publishes Systematisch-summarische Uebersicht der neuesten zoologischen Entdeckungen in Neuholland und Afrika
- 1794–6 James Bolton publishes Harmonia ruralis, an "essay towards a natural history of British songbirds", issued in two volumes.
- 1796 – Johann Alois Senefelder invents the low cost printing technique of lithography.
- 1797 – François Le Vaillant begins publication of his Oiseaux d'Afrique giving details of species encountered on his exploration of South Africa. This work was translated into several languages and established his fame as a bird artist.
- 1797–1804 – Publication of Thomas Bewick's A History of British Birds
- 1799 – François Marie Daudin writes Traité élémentaire et complet d'Ornithologie (Natural History of Birds), one of the first "modern" handbooks of ornithology, combining Linnean binomial nomenclature with the anatomical and physiological descriptions of Buffon. Unfortunately it was never completed.
- 1799 – Philippe-Isidore Picot de Lapeyrouse publishes Tables méthodiques des mammifères et des oiseaux observés dans le département de la Haute-Garonne. Also Bernard Germain de Lacépède, in Discours d'ouverture et de clôture du cours d'histoire naturelle, places the birds in 130 genera in 39 orders.
- 1799 – Alexander von Humboldt journeys to South America where he finds the oilbird. He described it in 1817. Later in the trip he observed the behaviour of the Andean condor

== 19th century ==
- 1800–1804 – "Le Geographe" and "Le Naturaliste" leave France for the Pacific Ocean under the overall command of Nicolas Baudin. The naturalists on board made a collection of over 100,000 zoological specimens. Many bird species will be described by Louis Pierre Vieillot and published in Nouveau dictionnaire d'histoire naturelle (1816–1819).
- 1800–1817 – Johann Conrad Susemihl publishes a 22-part survey of the birds of Germany, Teutsche Ornithologie oder Naturgeschichte aller Vögel Teutschlands in naturgetreuen Abbildungen und Beschreibungen.

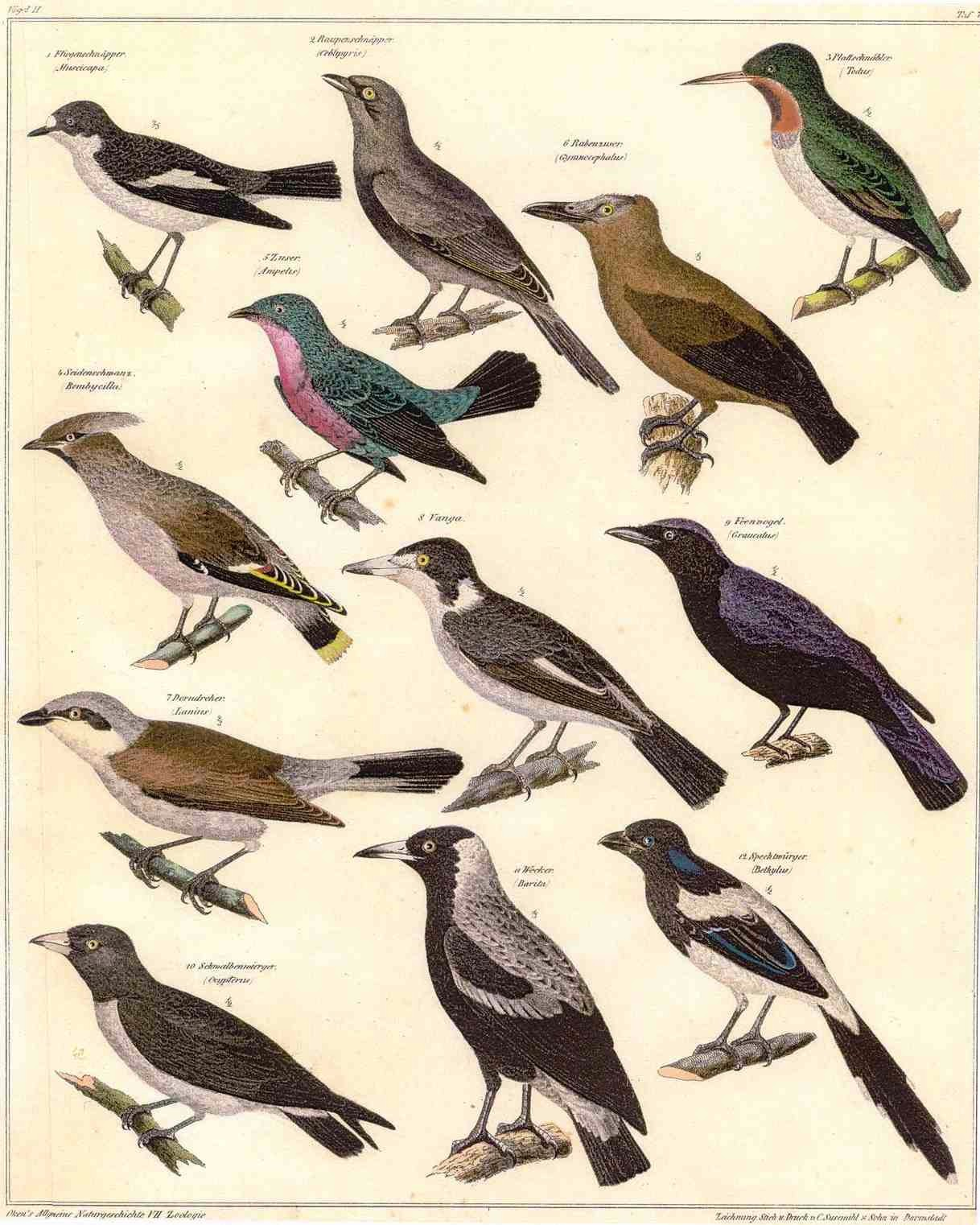
Plate by Johann Conrad Susemihl from the natural history series "Allgemeine Naturgeschichte für alle Stände" by Lorenz Oken (1779–1851)

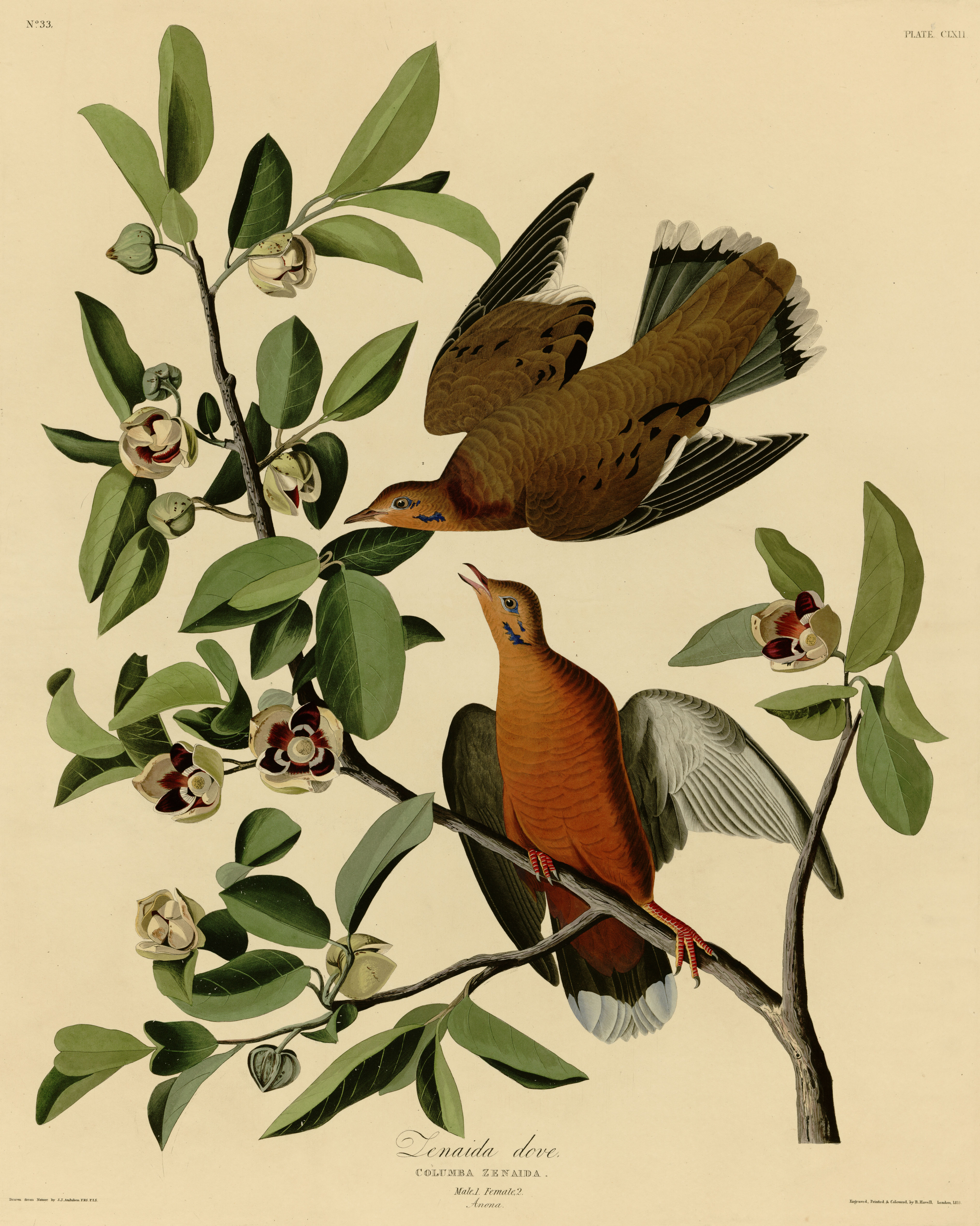
Zenaida dove Birds of America John James Audubon, 1827–1838

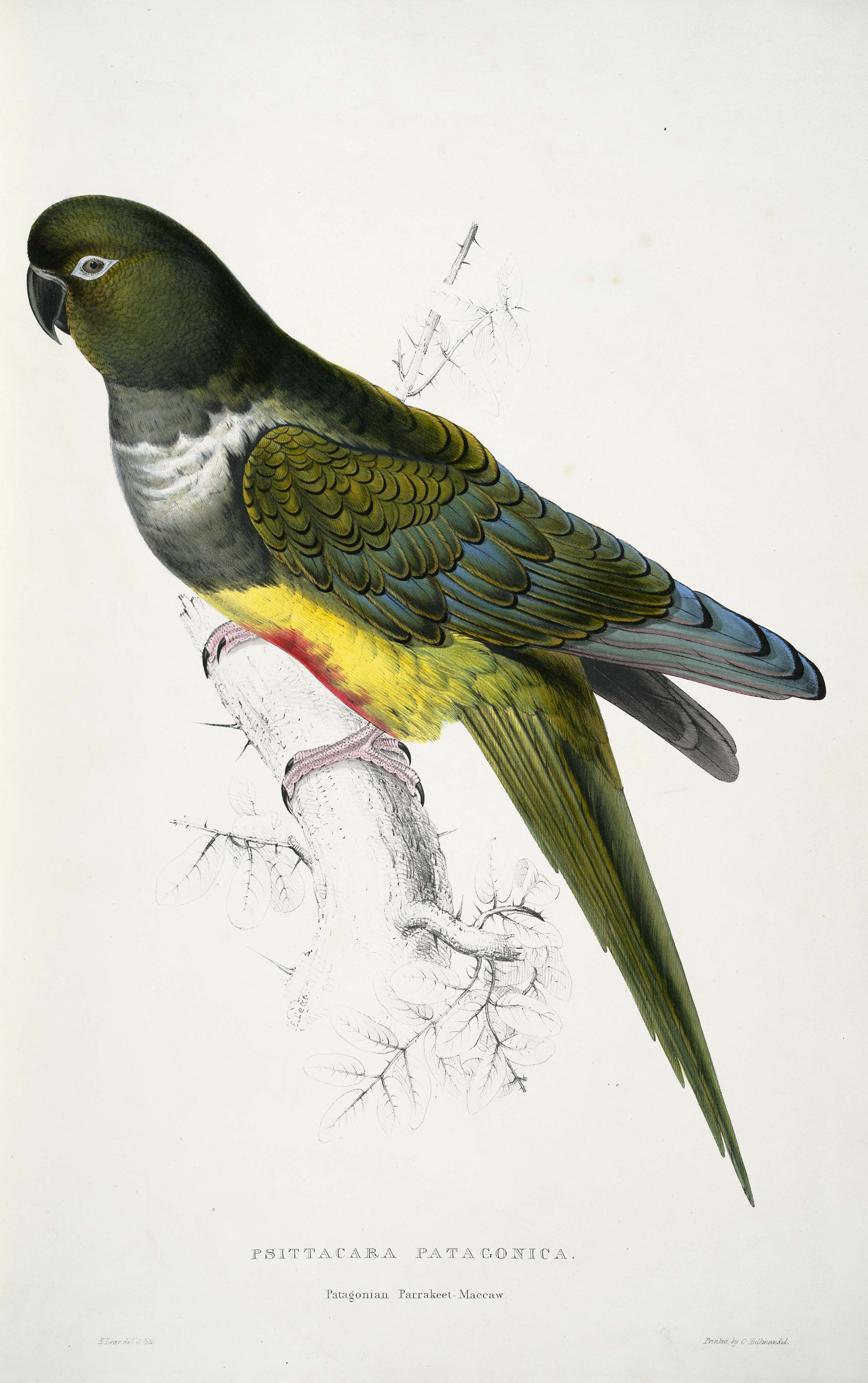
"Psittacara patagonica Patagonian Parrakeet-Maccaw" in Illustrations of the Family of Psittacidae, or Parrots, by Edward Lear, 1832

- 1801 – Alexander Wilson begins his study of North American birds, resulting in his American Ornithology (1808–1814), completed by George Ord, and later updated by Charles Lucien Bonaparte.
- 1802 – Publication of George Montagu's Ornithological Dictionary. In this year also Histoire des colibris, oiseaux-mouches, jacamars et promerops by Jean Baptiste Audebert was published two years after his death.
- 1802 – Louis Dufresne popularizes the use of arsenical soap for preserving birds, a technique which had enabled the Museum d'Histoire Naturelle in Paris to build the greatest collection of birds in the world
- 1804 Bewick's British Birds: see 1797
- 1804– 1806 – Lewis and Clark Expedition. This was the first overland expedition undertaken by the United States to the Pacific coast and back. The many birds seen include Steller's jay and greater prairie chicken.
- 1805 – Johann Fischer von Waldheim founded the Imperial Society of Naturalists of Moscow.
- 1806 – André Marie Constant Duméril publishes Zoologie analytique reducing the number of bird orders to six
- 1806 – Sébastien Gérardin publishes Tableau élémentaire d'ornithologie, ou Histoire naturelle des oiseaux que l'on rencontre communément en France
- 1811 – Publication of Peter Simon Pallas' Zoographia Russo-Asiatica includes details of the birds encountered in his journeys through Siberia
- 1811 – Marie Jules Cesar Lelorgne de Savigny publishes Système des oiseaux de l'Égypte et de la Syrie
- 1811 – Johann Karl Wilhelm Illiger published Prodromus systematis mammalium et avium in which he proposed the review of the Linnean system and firmly established the concept of the Family earlier proposed by François Marie Daudin. Illiger is considered the founder of the School of Nomenclatural Purists.
- 1812–13 – Johann Philipp Achilles Leisler describes new birds in Naturgeschichte Deutschlands begun by Johann Matthäus Bechstein. One is the little stint
- 1812 – Academy of Natural Sciences of Philadelphia founded.
- 1815 – Coenraad Jacob Temminck publishes his Manuel d'ornithologie, the standard work on European birds for many years
- 1816 – Blasius Merrem proposes a division of birds into Ratitae (ratites or running birds, with a flat sternum) and Carinatae (carinates or flying birds, with a keeled sternum), which formed part of his classification of birds in Tentamen Systematis Naturalis Avium
- 1817–1820 – Johann Baptist Ritter von Spix and Carl Friedrich Philipp von Martius expedition to Brazil. They collect 350 bird species which are conserved in Zoologische Staatssammlung München.
- 1819–1826 Friedrich Strack Naturgeschichte in Bildern mit erlauterdem Arnz & Co., Düsseldorf.
- 1820 – Heinrich Kuhl travels to Java with Johan Coenraad van Hasselt. They send 2000 bird skins to the Rijksmuseum van Natuurlijke Historie founded in the same year 1820.
- 1820–1844 – Johann Friedrich Naumann publishes Naturgeschichte der Vögel Deutschlands, The Natural History of German Birds
- 1820–23 – Encouraged by William Elford Leach William Swainson became the first illustrator and naturalist to use lithography for his Zoological Illustrations a relatively cheap work which did not require an engraver.
- (1826–39) – René Primevère Lesson writes the vertebrate zoological section of Voyage au tour du monde sur La Coquille. Lesson was the first naturalist to see live birds of paradise in the Moluccas and New Guinea.
- 1826–1829 – Jules Dumont d'Urville commands the first voyage of the Astrolabe. Zoological specimens from the South Pacific are collected for the Muséum national d'histoire naturelle in Paris. These include many birds.
- 1826–1829 – Russian Senjawin expedition. Heinrich von Kittlitz collects 754 specimens of 314 bird species, including unique specimens of species that subsequently became extinct to the museum of the Russian Academy of Sciences.
- 1826–1830 HMS Adventure and HMS Beagle under the overall command of Phillip Parker King begin a hydrographic survey of Patagonia and Tierra del Fuego. One of the birds collected and described by King is the imperial shag.
- 1827–1838 – Publication of John James Audubon's Birds of America
- 1828–1838 – Magnus von Wright publishes Svenska Foglar
- 1828 – Roret, (Libraire) publish the second edition of Pierre Boitard and Emmanuel Canivet Manuel du naturaliste préparateur ou l’art d’empailler les animaux et de conserver les végétaux et les minéraux
- 1831–1836 – Charles Darwin travels to South America and the Galapagos Islands on board HMS Beagle. His study of Galapagos finches gives him ideas on natural selection
- 1832 – Edward Lear publishes Illustrations of the Family of the Psittacidae, or Parrots
- 1832 – Johann Georg Wagler publishes Monographia Psittacorum
- 1832 – Pablo de La Llave describes the resplendent quetzal
- 1833 – Fauna Japonica based on the collections made by Philipp Franz von Siebold and his successor Heinrich Bürger commenced. It was published serially in five volumes between 1833 and 1850.
- 1837 – Eugen Ferdinand von Homeyer publishes a study of the birds of Pomerania Systematische Übersicht der Vögel Pommerns.
- 1837 – William MacGillivray begins his five-volume A History of British Birds, indigenous and migratory, completed in 1852.
- 1838 – John Gould travels to Australia with his wife Elizabeth to study the birds of that country
- 1840 – John Gould publishes the first part of The Birds of Australia
- 1840 – Luigi Benoit publishes Ornitologia Siciliana

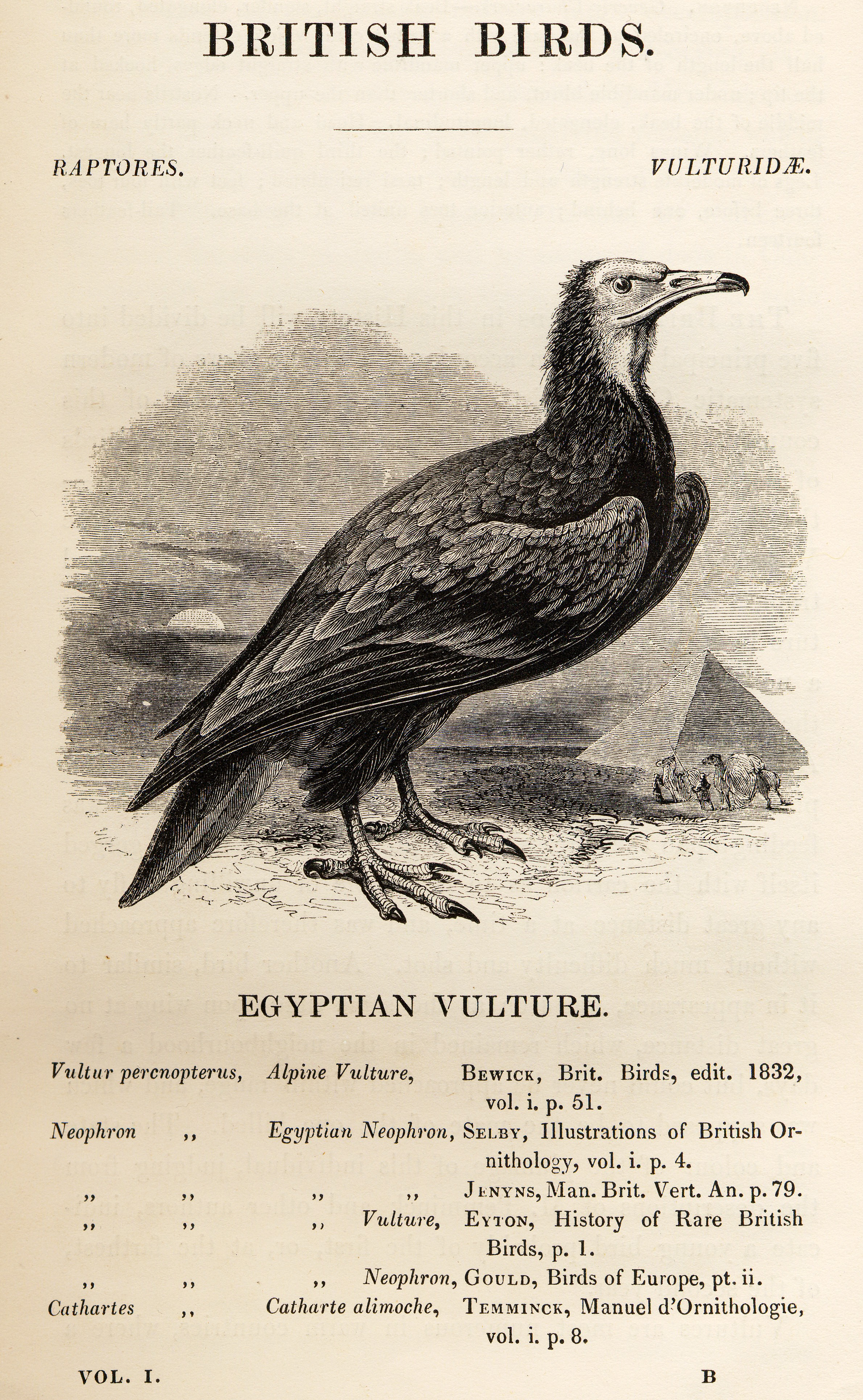
Egyptian vulture in William Yarrell's History of British Birds (1843)

- 1843 – William Yarrell publishes History of British Birds as a whole in three volumes. It first appeared in parts of 3 sheets every 2 months from 1837 onwards.
- 1843 – Publication of the Strickland Code, by a committee of the British Association for the Advancement of Science chaired by Hugh Strickland. This was the earliest formal codification of the principle of priority for zoological nomenclature and served as a basis for later codes.
- 1843–1849 – Artwork and scientific notes for John Cotton's Birds of the Port Phillip District of New South Wales gathered.
- 1844 – The last great auk is recorded in Iceland
- 1844 (– 1849) – George Robert Gray head of the ornithological section of the British Museum, now the Natural History Museum publishes Genera of Birds (1844–49), illustrated by David William Mitchell and Joseph Wolf. It includes 46,000 references.
- 1846 – Thomas Bellerby Wilson purchases the bird collection of François Victor Masséna
- 1850 – Deutsche Ornithologen-Gesellschaft founded.
- 1853– 1856 – John Cassin Illustrations of the Birds of California, Texas, Oregon, British and Russian America
- 1855 – Alexander von Middendorff writes Die Isepiptesen Russlands, an account of bird migration in Russia.
- 1855 – Wagner Free Institute of Science founded
- 1857 – Philip Sclater presents his paper (published in 1858) "On the General Geographical Distribution of the Members of the Class Aves" to the Linnean Society, setting up six zoological regions which he called the Palaearctic, Aethiopian, Indian, Australasian, Nearctic and Neotropical. They are still in use.
- 1858 – Alfred Newton forms the British Ornithologists' Union
- 1859 – Hermann Schlegel sends Heinrich Agathon Bernstein to collect birds in New Guinea.
- 1861 – Fossil of Archaeopteryx found in Germany supports link between dinosaurs and birds.
- 1861 – Museum Godeffroy founded in Hamburg. The museum is devoted to the zoology and ethnography of the South Seas and Australia.
- 1864 – Illustrirtes Tierleben commenced
- 1866 – August Emil Holmgren Skandinaviens foglar (Birds of Scandinavia)
- 1868 – Association for the Protection of Sea-Birds formed in England
- 1868 – Bernard Altum publishes Der Vogel und sein Leben (Birds and their lives)
- 1868–1882 – José Vicente Barbosa du Bocage begins Aves das possessões portuguesas d’ Africa occidental que existem no Museu de Lisboa, da 1ª à 24ª lista 1868 a 1882.
- 1869 – The Sea Birds Preservation Act 1869 is the first law passed in the United Kingdom to protect birds.
- 1870 – The Naturalists' Guide by Charles Johnson Maynard is published by James R. Osgood & Co. with illustrations by Edwin Lord Weeks.
- 1871 – Henry Eeles Dresser commences A History of the Birds of Europe with Richard Bowdler Sharpe.
- 1872 – Leonardo Fea becomes an assistant at Museo Civico di Storia Naturale di Genova.
- 1872 – Julius von Haast describes Harpagornis moorei, the extinct bird subsequently known as Haast's eagle.
- 1872–1877 – Christoph Gottfried Andreas Giebel begins Thesaurus ornithologiae
- 1873 – Publication of Ornitologia Italiana by Paolo Savi
- 1873 – Biophysicist Hermann von Helmholtz develops a mathematical law of bird flight.
- 1874 – Richard Bowdler Sharpe publishes the first of a series of catalogues of birds in the collection of the British Museum.
- 1876 – Friedrich Brüggeman publishes Beiträge zur Ornithologie von Celebes und Sangir.
- 1877 – Émile Oustalet and Armand David publish Les Oiseaux de la Chine.
- 1879 – Richard Owen publishes the results of his studies of moa fossils.
- 1879 – Tommaso Salvadori publishes Ornitologia della Papuasia e delle Molucche. Torino.
- 1880 – Percy Evans Freke 1880 A comparative catalogue of birds found in Europe and North America. The Scientific proceedings of the Royal Dublin Society.
- 1881 – Kōno Bairei publishes Album of One Hundred Birds.
- 1883 – Foundation of the American Ornithologists' Union
- 1883 – Foundation of the Bombay Natural History Society
- 1884 – First International Ornithological Congress held in Vienna, with Gustav Radde as President
- 1884 – Elliott Coues writes to The Auk beginning a successful campaign to establish trinomial nomenclature – the taxonomic classification of subspecies.
- 1886 – Herman Schalow publishes Die Musophagidae.
- 1887 – Edgar Leopold Layard publishes The Birds of South Africa.
- 1888 – Max Fürbringer uses a mathematical analysis to create a classification system for birds that influences avian taxonomy throughout the 20th century
- 1889 – Foundation of the Royal Society for the Protection of Birds to campaign against the plumage trade
- 1889 – Ludwig Koch makes the first sound recording of birdsong, that of a captive white-rumped shama Copsychus malabaricus
- 1889 – Pioneer of aviation Otto Lilienthal publishes Birdflight as the Basis of Aviation
- 1889 (– 1898) – Eugene William Oates and William Thomas Blanford publish the bird volumes of The Fauna of British India, Including Ceylon and Burma.
- 1889 – The Imperial Natural History Museum opens in Vienna. The collections are vast, partly due to Empress Maria Theresa having encouraged science in the middle of the previous century, influenced and instructed by her personal physician Gerard van Swieten.
- 1889 – Charles B. Cory publishes The Birds of the West Indies
- 1890 – Giovanni Batista Grassi and Raimondo Feletti discover avian malaria
- 1892 – Walter Rothschild opens a private museum in Tring. It housed one of the largest natural history collections in the world.
- 1894 – Although Ignazio Porro had invented binoculars in 1859, high quality binoculars were first on sale in 1894, after the optical designs of Ernst Abbe were combined with the production techniques of Carl Zeiss. Binoculars revolutionised bird identification and field observation.
- 1895 – Emil Weiske begins collecting in New Guinea.
- 1896 – Valentin Lvovich Bianchi becomes head of the Department of Ornithology at the Imperial Academy of Sciences of Petrograd.
- 1899 – Hans Christian Cornelius Mortensen of Viborg, Denmark, is the first ornithologist to undertake systematic large-scale ringing. He uses numbered aluminium rings to mark 165 common starlings caught in nestboxes

== 1900–1950 ==
- 1900 – Ernst Hartert monographs the Trochilidae in volume 9 of the series Das Tierreich (the Animal Kingdom) published in Berlin by R. Friedländer und Sohn
- 1900 – Edmond de Sélys Longchamps bird collection given to the Royal Belgian Institute of Natural Sciences
- 1900 – National Audubon Society organises the first Christmas Bird Count
- 1901 – Johannes Thienemann establishes Rossitten Bird Observatory, the world's first bird observatory
- 1901 – The Royal Australasian Ornithologists Union established
- 1902 – Wild Birds Protection Act 1902
- 1905 – Foundation of the National Audubon Society
- 1905 – Philogène Auguste Galilée Wytsman commences the serial publications Genera Avium
- 1905 – Joseph Whitaker publishes The Birds of Tunisia
- 1905–1906 – Bror Yngve Sjöstedt Wissenschaftliche Ergebnisse der Schwedischen Zoologischen Expedition nach dem Kilimandjaro, dem Meru und umgebenden Massaisteppen Deutsch-Ostafrikas.
- 1907 – The monthly journal British Birds begins publication
- 1907 – Kurt Floericke becomes the editor of Kosmos – Die Zeitschrift für alle Freunde der Natur or Magazine for the Friends of Nature
- 1909 – First organised ringing schemes in the UK
- 1909 – Heligoland Bird Observatory is established on Heligoland by Hugo Weigold. Birds are collected in specially designed wire-netting traps, still known today as "Heligoland traps"
- 1909 – First known mapping census carried out in Kent, England by the Alexander brothers
- 1909 Ornithologists James Chapin and Herbert Lang begin a six-year biological survey of the Belgian Congo.
- 1910–1911 – Sandy Wollaston leads the British Ornithological Union Expedition to Dutch New Guinea
- 1910 – Museum Oologicum R. Kreuger commenced by Ragnar Kreuger
- 1910–1913 – Edward Adrian Wilson is the zoologist on the Terra Nova Expedition. He died with the rest of the party but in 1987 Edward Wilson's Birds of the Antarctic was edited by Brian Roberts and posthumously published
- 1912 – A barn swallow ringed by James Masefield in Staffordshire, England is recovered in Natal, South Africa
- 1912 – Giacomo Damiani and Conte Arrigoni degli Oddi Birds of the Tuscan Archipelago
- 1914 – The last passenger pigeon dies in Cincinnati Zoo
- 1914 – Emilie Snethlage publishes Catálogo das Aves Amazônicas
- 1914 – Stresemann, Erwin publishes Aves in the Handbuch der Zoologie.
- 1915 – Cornell Lab of Ornithology founded
- 1915 – Eduard Daniel van Oort becomes director of the Rijksmuseum of Natural History in Leiden.
- 1916 – Marion Ellis Rowan paints birds on the first of many trips to New Guinea.
- 1918–1949 – Carl Eduard Hellmayr ends the chaos of systematic and nomenclatural confusion created by previous ornithologists working on South American birds in Catalogue of Birds of the Americas. It takes four decades and fifteen volumes.
- 1921–1932 The Whitney South Sea Expedition visits islands in the south Pacific region collecting over 40,000 bird specimens. The expedition also seals the extinction of the Guadalupe caracara

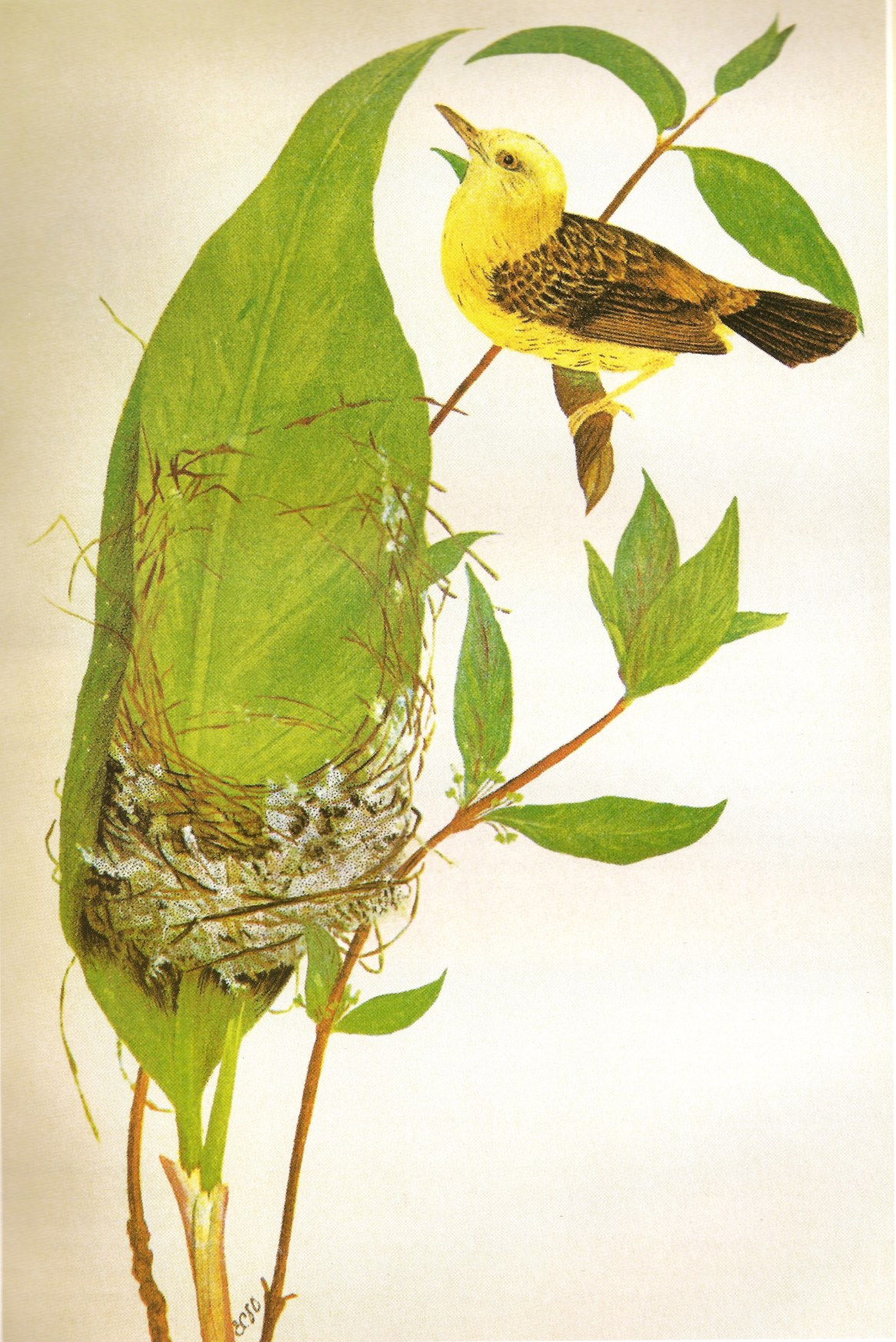
Yellow-headed fan-tailed warbler Cisticola exilis tytleri from The Fauna of British India, including Ceylon and Burma. 2nd edition, 1924

- 1922 – Foundation of the International Council for Bird Preservation (now BirdLife International)
- 1922 – Publication of John Charles Phillips's A Natural History of the Ducks, which provides maps of the known breeding and wintering distributions of ducks throughout the world
- 1922 William Rowan tests the effect of photoperiodism on the size of gonads in birds
- 1925 – Perrine Millais Moncrieff publishes a field guide New Zealand Birds and How to Identify Them.
- 1927 – Frédéric Courtois publishes Les oiseaux du musée de Zi-Kia-Wei
- 1928 – Ernst Mayr leads the first of three expeditions to New Guinea and the Solomon Islands, during which he discovers many new species
- 1929 – Conte Arrigoni degli Oddi publishes Ornitologia Italiana.
- 1929 – Friedrich von Lucanus publishes Zugvögel und Vogelzug (Migratory birds and bird migration)
- 1930 – Alexander Wetmore publishes his Systematic Classification
- 1931 – Ernst Schüz and Hugo Weigold publish Atlas des Vogelzuges, the first atlas of bird migration

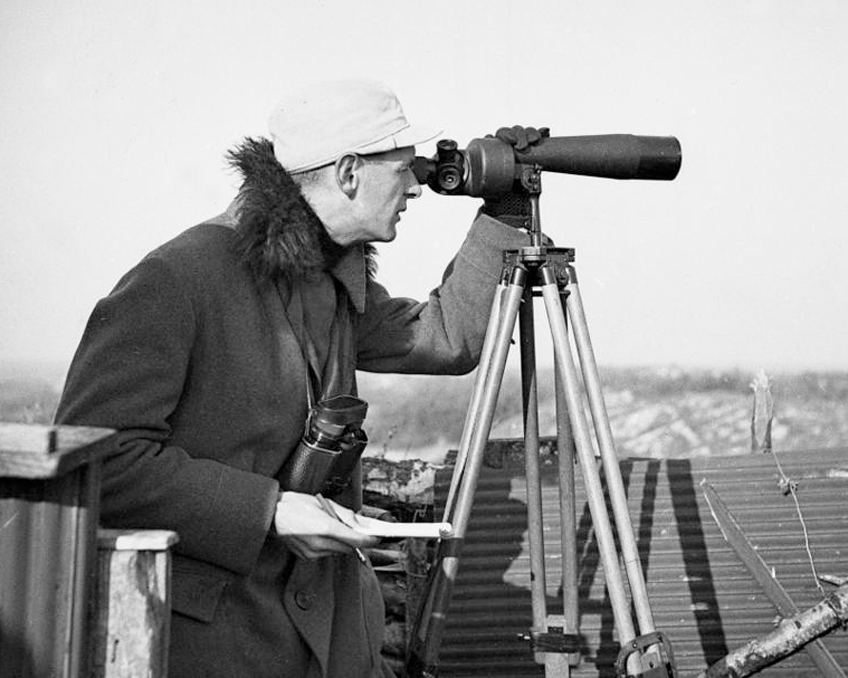
Rossitten Bird Observatory, 1939

- 1931 – Jean Théodore Delacour publishes Les Oiseaux de L'Indochine Française
- 1931-1987 – James L. Peters's Check-List of Birds of the World published in 15 volumes.
- 1932 – Foundation of the British Trust for Ornithology for the study of birds in Britain
- 1932 – Yoshimaro Yamashina founds the Yamashina Institute for Ornithology at his home in Shibuya, Tokyo. His research centred on the use of the chromosomes of bird to distinguish species (and, later, DNA).
- 1933 – Nagamichi Kuroda publishes Birds of the Island of Java (2 Volumes, 1933–36).
- 1934 – Roger Tory Peterson publishes his Guide to the Birds, the first modern field guide.
- 1934–37 – Brian Roberts is the expedition ornithologist on John Rymill's British Graham Land Expedition (BGLE).
- 1935 – Konrad Lorenz publishes his study of imprinting in young ducklings and goslings.
- 1936 – Robert Cushman Murphy publishes Oceanic Birds of South America.
- 1937 – Margaret Morse Nice publishes Studies in the Life History of the Song Sparrow.
- 1937 – Theodosius Dobzhansky publishes Genetics and the Origin of Species a key work of what is to become known as the modern evolutionary synthesis.
- 1938 – Foundation of the Edward Grey Institute of Field Ornithology.
- 1938–1941 – The Handbook of British Birds commenced.
- 1940 – Claude Gibney Finch-Davies plates held by the Transvaal Museum form the basis for Austin Roberts The Birds of Southern Africa
- 1943 – David Lack makes calculations of bird mortality using reports of ringed birds.
- 1946 – Peter Scott founds the Wildfowl & Wetlands Trust at Slimbridge.
- 1947 – David Lack publishes Darwin's Finches.
- 1948 – IUCN Red List of Threatened Species founded as conservation concerns grow.

== 1950–2000 ==
- 1950 – Rocket nets developed by the Wildfowl Trust for catching geese
- 1950 – Willi Hennig publishes Grundzüge einer Theorie der phylogenetischen Systematik (Basic outline of a theory of phylogenetic systematics). This work, at first obscure and controversial, founds cladistics and is mainstream by 1980.
- 1951–1954 – The six volume Birds of the Soviet Union by GP Dementev and NA Gladkov published
- 1953 – Niko Tinbergen publishes The Herring Gull's World
- 1953 – Ornithologist Olivier Messiaen composes the orchestral work Réveil des Oiseaux—based on birdsong in the Jura Mountains.
- 1954 – Protection of Birds Act 1954 in the UK prohibits the collection of birds' eggs
- 1954 – The Heinz Sielmann film Zimmerleute des Waldes (Carpenters of the forest) shown on UK television with the title Woodpecker. It was a huge success.
- 1954 – First edition of Avian Physiology published by Paul D. Sturkie. The work related mainly to domestic birds and especially poultry, but later editions of the work, now titled Sturkie's Avian Physiology include studies of wild birds.
- 1954 – Arthur Cain refers to the "circular overlaps" of Mayr (1942) as ring species in Animal species and evolution
- 1954 – Richard Meinertzhagen publishes Birds of Arabia based on the work of George Latimer Bates
- 1956 – First use of mist nets (invented in Japan) in the UK to trap birds
- 1957 – Frances and Frederick Hamerstrom publish Guide to Prairie Chicken Management. The ecological scatter pattern approach has broad significance in bird habitat conservation
- 1957 – G. Evelyn Hutchinson develops the niche concept
- 1959 – Charles Vaurie publishes The Birds of the Palearctic Fauna: a Systematic Reference
- 1959 – Humphrey–Parkes terminology for the description of plumage introduced
- 1960 – Max Schönwetter dies. His monumental Handbuch der Oologie is taken over by Wilhelm Meise
- 1961 – Nature photographer Sakae Tamura publishes Tamagawa no tori, (Birds of River Tama, Tokyo)
- 1961 – Eric Hosking publishes Bird Photography as a Hobby, popularising bird photography.
- 1961 – William Homan Thorpe publishes Bird-Song. The biology of vocal communication and expression in birds pioneering the use of sound spectrography in bird studies.
- 1962 – Rachel Carson publishes Silent Spring, describing the ecological dangers of pesticides.
- 1963 (−1968) David Armitage Bannerman begins publication of The Birds of the Atlantic Islands
- 1964 – The relationship between birds and dinosaurs is re-examined in what becomes known as the dinosaur renaissance
- 1967 – Publication of Radar Ornithology by Eric Eastwood
- 1967 – Edward O. Wilson and Robert H. MacArthur publish The Theory of Island Biogeography
- 1967 – Birds of prey aviary opens at Zoo de La Flèche
- 1968–1972 – First national breeding bird atlas project conducted in Britain and Ireland
- 1969 – Robert T. Paine first uses the term keystone species
- 1970 – The Atlas of Breeding Birds of the West Midlands by Lord and Munns, based on field work by members of the West Midland Bird Club, published by Collins, is the first to use systematic grid-based method for gathering of information.
- 1970 – Derek Ratcliffe discovers changes attributable to pesticides in egg breakage frequency and eggshell thickness in some British birds and publishes a paper so titled in the Journal of Applied Ecology
- 1971–1973 – Hans-Wilhelm Koepcke combines many biological concepts in Die Lebensformen: Grundlagen zu einer universell gültigen biologischen Theorie in English, Life Forms: The basis for a universally valid biological theory. Birds, and Peruvian or South American birds especially figure prominently.
- 1972–75 – Grzimek's Animal Life Encyclopedia (1967–1972) is translated into English.
- 1975 – Ramsar Convention (The Convention on Wetlands of International Importance, especially as Waterfowl Habitat) comes into force.
- 1975 – Rara aves Elizabeth V. Kozlova publishes The birds of zonal steppes and deserts of Central Asia
- 1975 – Victor Hasselblad tests the Hasselblad AB 2000 camera at Nidingen, the only place in Sweden where the black-legged kittiwake nests.
- 1975 – A translation of Stresemann, Erwin Entwicklung der Ornithologie is published as Ornithology: From Aristotle to the Present
- 1976 – Publication of national bird atlases for Great Britain and Ireland, France and Denmark
- 1977 – EURING Data Bank (EDB) was established as a central repository for European ringing recovery records.

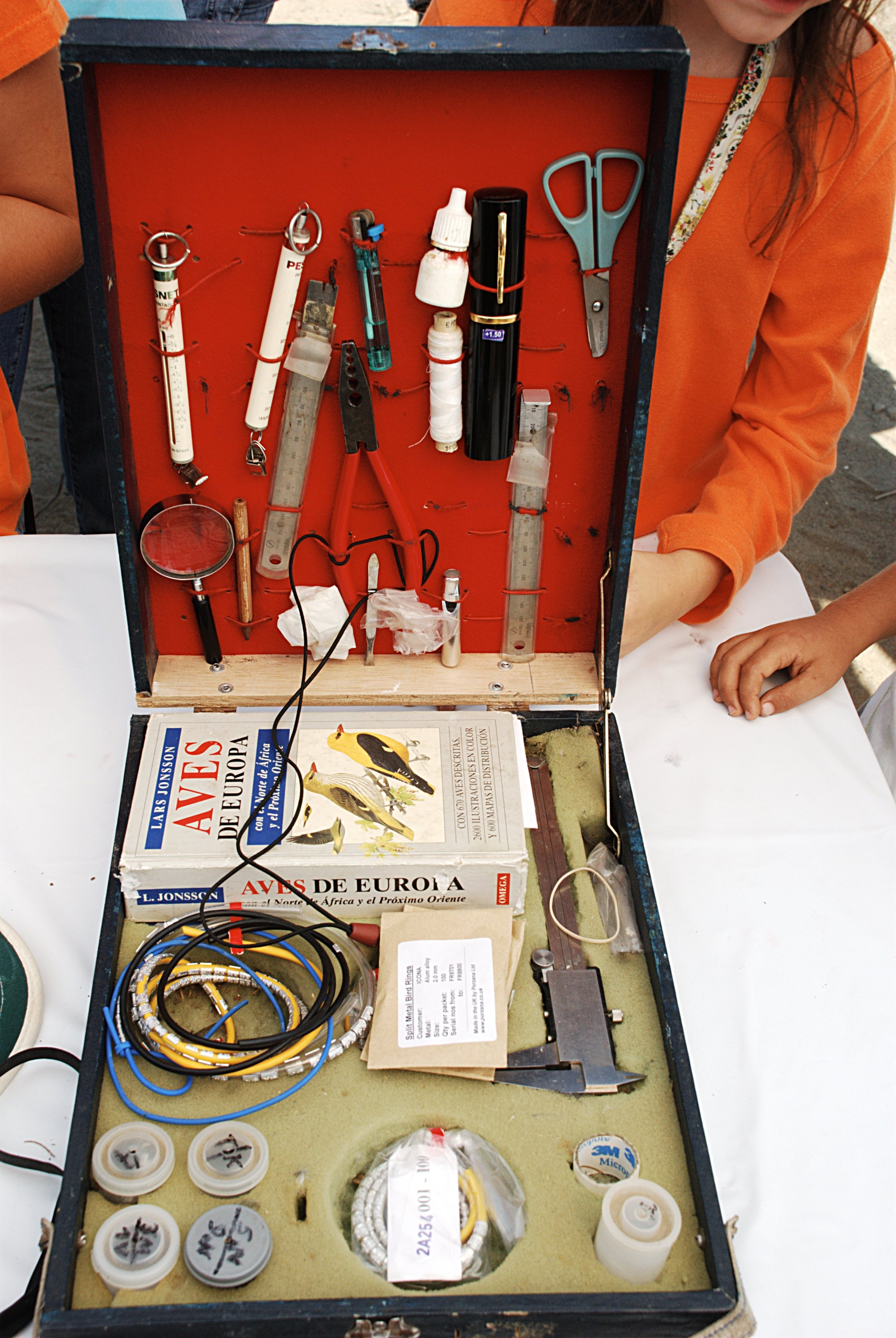
Bird studies become part of educational programmes in European countries from the 1980s onwards. Here scouts in Spain are being instructed in bird ringing.

- 1977 – Publication of the first volume of The Birds of the Western Palearctic
- 1981 – Sibley and Ahlquist use DNA-DNA hybridisation to determine genetic similarity between species, leading to the Sibley–Ahlquist taxonomy of birds.
- 1981 – Cyril A. Walker describes the Enantiornithes, a new subclass of fossil birds [Walker CA (1981) New subclass of birds from the Cretaceous of South America. Nature 292:51–53.]
- 1984 – Publication of The Atlas of Australian Birds
- 1984 – Umbrella species defined.
- 1986 – Jürgen Haffer combines allopatry, parapatry, refugia and superspecies in a holistic theory explaining speciation.
- 1987 – Sociedad de Ornitología Neotropical (SON) (Neotropical Ornithological Society) founded.
- 1990 – Discovery of the first poisonous bird, the hooded pitohui (Pitohui dichrous) by Jack Dumbacher
- 1990 – Leo Surenovich Stepanyan publishes Conspectus of the ornithological fauna of the USSR
- 1990 – Sálim Ali Centre for Ornithology and Natural History founded
- 1990 – Frank Gill publishes Ornithology.
- 1991 – First new species described without a skin as a type specimen. The Bulo Burti boubou (Laniarius liberatus) of Somalia described on basis of DNA sequence from a feather.
- 1991 – A color atlas of avian anatomy by John McLelland explores the external features, skeleton, and body systems of birds
- 1992 – Publication of the Handbook of Birds of the World series starts
- 1992 – Avibase database commenced by Bird Studies Canada. At 2010 the database holds 5 million records of 10,000 species (22,000 subspecies) and has online World checklists, taxonomic notes and multilingual synonyms.
- 1993 – Vision, brain, and behavior in birds by H Philip Zeigler and Hans-Joachim Bischof published
- 1994 – Jonathan Weiner publishes The Beak of the Finch: A Story of Evolution in Our Time
- 1995 – Hou Lianhai describes the Confuciusornis, a new subclass of birds, from a fossil found in the Jinzhou market, Liaoning, China
- 1997 – Use of stable hydrogen isotope signatures in feathers to identify origin of birds.
- 1997 – The EBCC Atlas of European Breeding Birds published
- 1998 – Discovery of gut reduction before migration in godwits.
- 1998 – Alison J. Stattersfield, Michael J. Crosby, Adrian J. Long, and David C. Wege publish Endemic Bird Areas of the World: Priorities for Biodiversity Conservation
- 1998 – The Life of Birds, a BBC nature documentary series written and presented by David Attenborough, is transmitted to millions of viewers in the UK.
- 1998 – Katala Foundation commences the Philippine Cockatoo Conservation Programme.
- 1999 – Alan Feduccia publishes The Origin and Evolution of Birds arguing against the view that birds originated from and are deeply nested within Theropoda (and are therefore living theropod dinosaurs).

== 21st century ==
eBird is an online database of bird observations providing scientists, researchers and amateur naturalists with real-time data about bird distribution and abundance

- 2000 – Harold Lisle Gibbs, Michael D. Sorenson, Karen Marchetti, Nick Davies, M. de L. Brooke and Hiroshi Nakamura provide genetic evidence for female host-specific races of the common cuckoo
- 2002 – Peter Bennett and Ian Owens publish Evolutionary Ecology of Birds: Life Histories, Mating systems, and Extinction
- 2002 – eBird is launched.
- 2003 – Michael D. Sorenson, Elen Oneal, Jaime García-Moreno and David P. Mindell discuss the enigmatic hoatzin without reaching a conclusion in a paper entitled "More Taxa, More Characters: The Hoatzin Problem Is Still Unresolved."
- 2004 – Proposal to identify bird species through DNA sequence by Hebert PDN et al. using method termed as DNA barcoding.
- 2004 – Sandy Podulka, Ronald W. Rohrbaugh, Jr., and Rick Bonney edit second edition of Handbook of Bird Biology.
- 2005 – Sightings of ivory-billed woodpecker, previously believed extinct.
- 2005 – Douglas Warrick and his research associates publish Aerodynamics of the hovering hummingbird in Nature.
- 2005 – Pamela C. Rasmussen and John C. Anderton publish Birds of South Asia. The Ripley Guide
- 2010 – The clade Bernieridae is described.
- 2011 – Longrich and Olson detail wing modifications in the extinct Jamaican flightless ibis and speculate that the wings were used as weapons
- 2014 – A genomic study of 48 taxa divided Neoaves into two main clades, Columbea and Passerea.
- 2018 – Publication of Ornithology: Foundation, Analysis, and Application.
- 2024 – A genomic study updated Neoaves and proposed the clade Elementaves.

== See also ==
- Apostles of Linnaeus
- Aves in the 10th edition of Systema Naturae
- Bird collections
- Category:Ornithologists by nationality
- European and American voyages of scientific exploration
- Indian natural history with timeline
- List of country and regional avifaunas Gives an insight into faunistic bird studies in the years 1980 to date.
- List of years in birding and ornithology
- Science in the Age of Enlightenment
- Timeline of European exploration
- List of natural history dealers

== Sources ==
- Allen, Elsa Guerdrum (1951). "The history of American ornithology before Audubon". Transactions of the American Philosophical Society. 41 (3): 387–591. Bibcode:1951TAPS...41..387A. doi:10.2307/1005629. JSTOR 1005629.
- Boubier, Maurice. (1925) L’Évolution de l’ornithologie. Nouvelle collection scientifique, Paris.
- Chansigaud, Valerie. (2010) The History of Ornithology New Holland. ISBN 978-1-84773-433-4 (First published in France in 2007 as Histoire de l'ornithologie)
- Bruce, Murray (2003). "Foreword: A brief history of classifying birds". In del Hoyo, J.; Elliott, A.; Christie, D.A. (eds.). Handbook of the Birds of the World. Vol. 8: Broadbills to Tapaculos. Barcelona: Lynx Edicions. pp. 11–43. ISBN 978-84-87334-50-4.
- Farber, Paul Lawrence (1977). "The development of taxidermy and the history of ornithology". Isis. 68 (4): 550–566. Bibcode:1977Isis...68..550F. doi:10.1086/351874.
- Gebhardt, Ludwig (2006) Die Ornithologen Mitteleuropas. Aula-Verlag, Wiebelsheim.
- Haffer J. (2001) Ornithological research traditions in central Europe during the 19th and 20th centuries. Journal of Ornithology 142: 27–93
- Robin, Libby. (2001) The Flight of the Emu: a hundred years of Australian ornithology 1901–2001. Carlton, Vic. Melbourne University Press.
- Stresemann, Erwin (1975). Ornithology: From Aristotle to the Present. Cambridge, Massachusetts: Harvard University Press.
- Walters, Michael (2003). A Concise History of Ornithology. London: Christophen Helm. ISBN 1-873403-97-6.
