= Friedrich Lindner (ornithologist) =

German pastor and ornithologist (1892 – 1922)

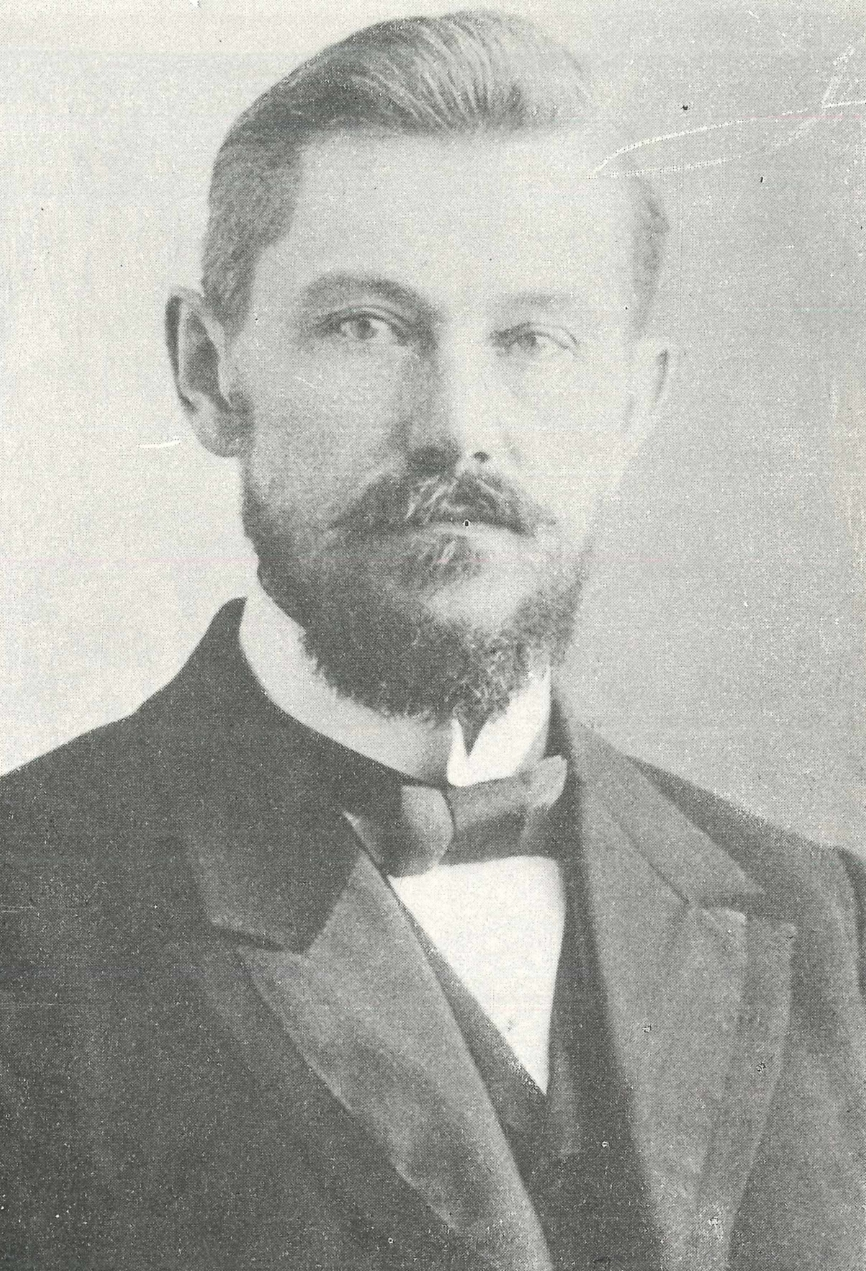

Johann Friedrich Lindner (13 April 1864 – 26 May 1922) was a German pastor and ornithologist. He was among the first to notice the intensity of migratory birds over the Curonian Spit and particularly Rossiten which was later developed into a bird observatory by his school friend Johannes Thienemann.

== Life and work ==
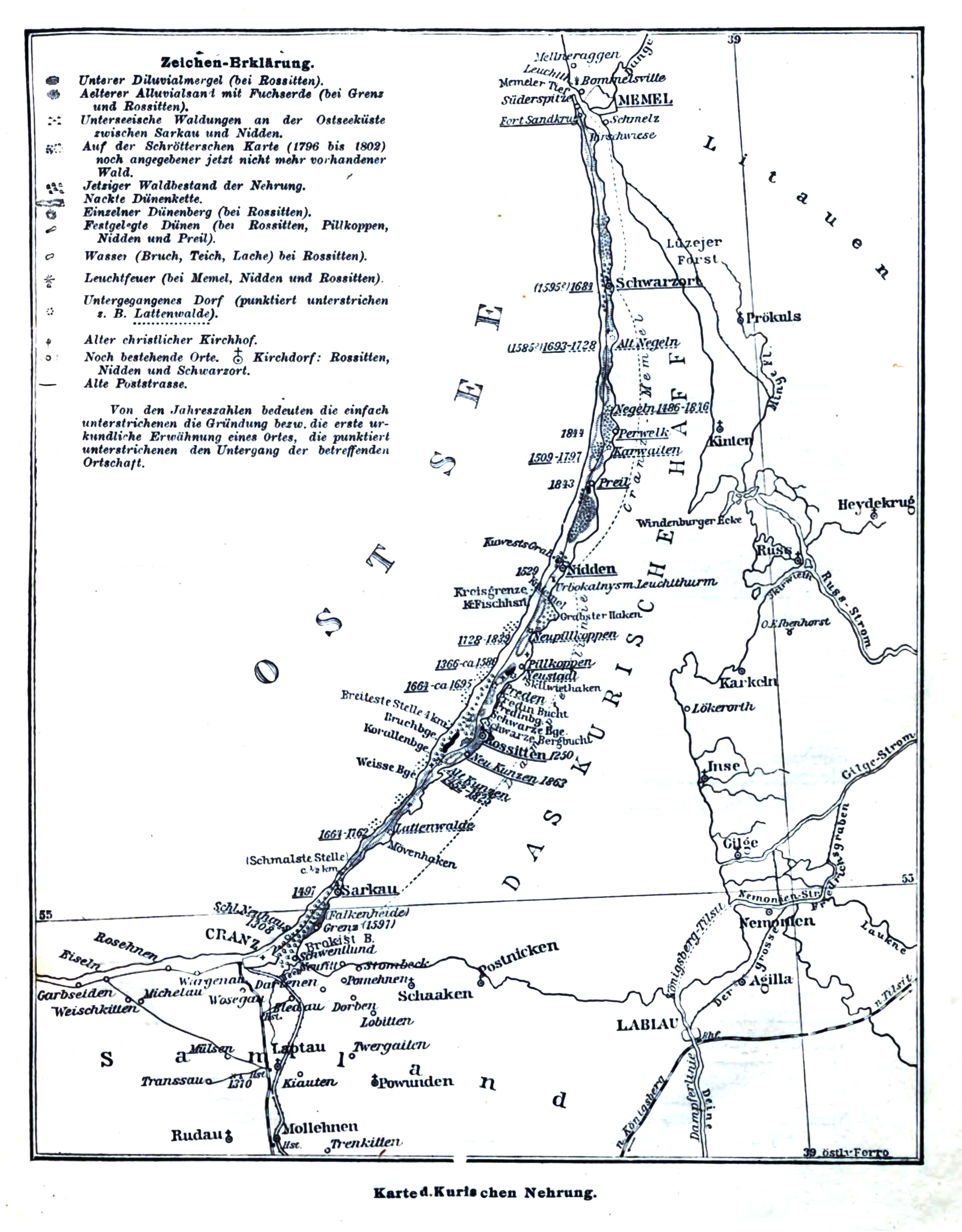
Map of the Curonian Spit made by Lindner

Johann Friedrich Lindner was born in Krössuln in Weissenfels, the son of Thuringian school teacher Carl Friedrich and Charlotte née Schröer. His younger brother Carl and his year older schoolmate Johannes Thienemann became interested in birds at school in Zeitz (1874-1883). Curt Floericke was five years younger. He later went to study in Leipzig and then at Halle. Lindner went to study theology at Königsberg in 1888. Animal artist Heinrich Krüger (1863-1901) who had a special interest in elks took him for the first time in April 1888 to the Curonian Spit where Lindner was amazed by the migratory birdlife. He then made repeated trips to the region.

In July 1892 Lindner joined a pastorate in Osterwieck am Harz and in 1907 to Quedlinborg where he became senior pastor in 1912. In the meantime he married Lisbeth née Messelhäuser. He continued to take an interest in the local birds. In 1922 he wrote an obituary for Alwin Voigt and died just 13 days after.
