= Carl Richard Hennicke =

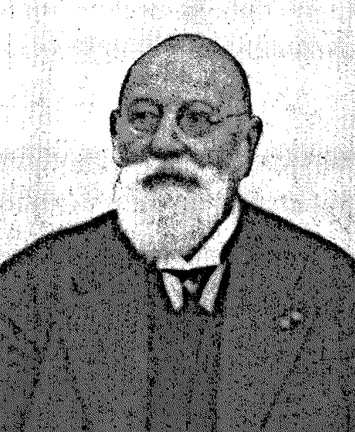
In 1935

Carl Richard Hennicke (December 26, 1865 – August 27, 1941) was a German ornithologist and medical doctor who edited the magazine Ornithologische Monatsschrift for 45 years and was involved in producing a revised edition of Naumann's work on the birds of central Europe which resulted in the 12 volume "Neuer Naumann".

Hennicke was born in Chemnitz, the son of a merchant. The family moved to Gera in 1873 and when his father was ill, he was taken care of by Karl Theodor Liebe. He became interested in birds after seeing Liebe's bird collections. Hennicke studied medicine from the University of Leipzig and began a practice in Gera. He specialized in ear, nose and eye diseases. He made trips to various parts of Europe to study birds. He began to revise Naumann's birds of central Europe from 1885 which resulted in the so-called "New Naumann" which was considered a master-work of the period. He made many trips including to West Africa, Spain, Finland, Italy and Scandinavia between 1891 and 1927. From 1912 he served as a professor at the Imperial Biological Institute for Agriculture and Forestry. He was involved in establishing the bird sanctuary of Memmert near Juist along with Hans von Berlepsch and Otto Leege. He supported the rise of the Third Reich during a period of German economic depression. He also headed the bird conservation organization "Deutscher Verein zur Schutze der Vogelwelt" from 1895 after the death of Jacobi von Wangelin with whom he managed the organization from 1884 following the death of Thienemann (and after Liebe declined a position). He led the organization until 1911. His home "Groben Hulda" in Gera was a place where he welcomed visitors along with his wife Mathilde (born Heffter) and two daughters. He died from a heart condition.
