= Ignaz Albrecht =

Austrian engraver

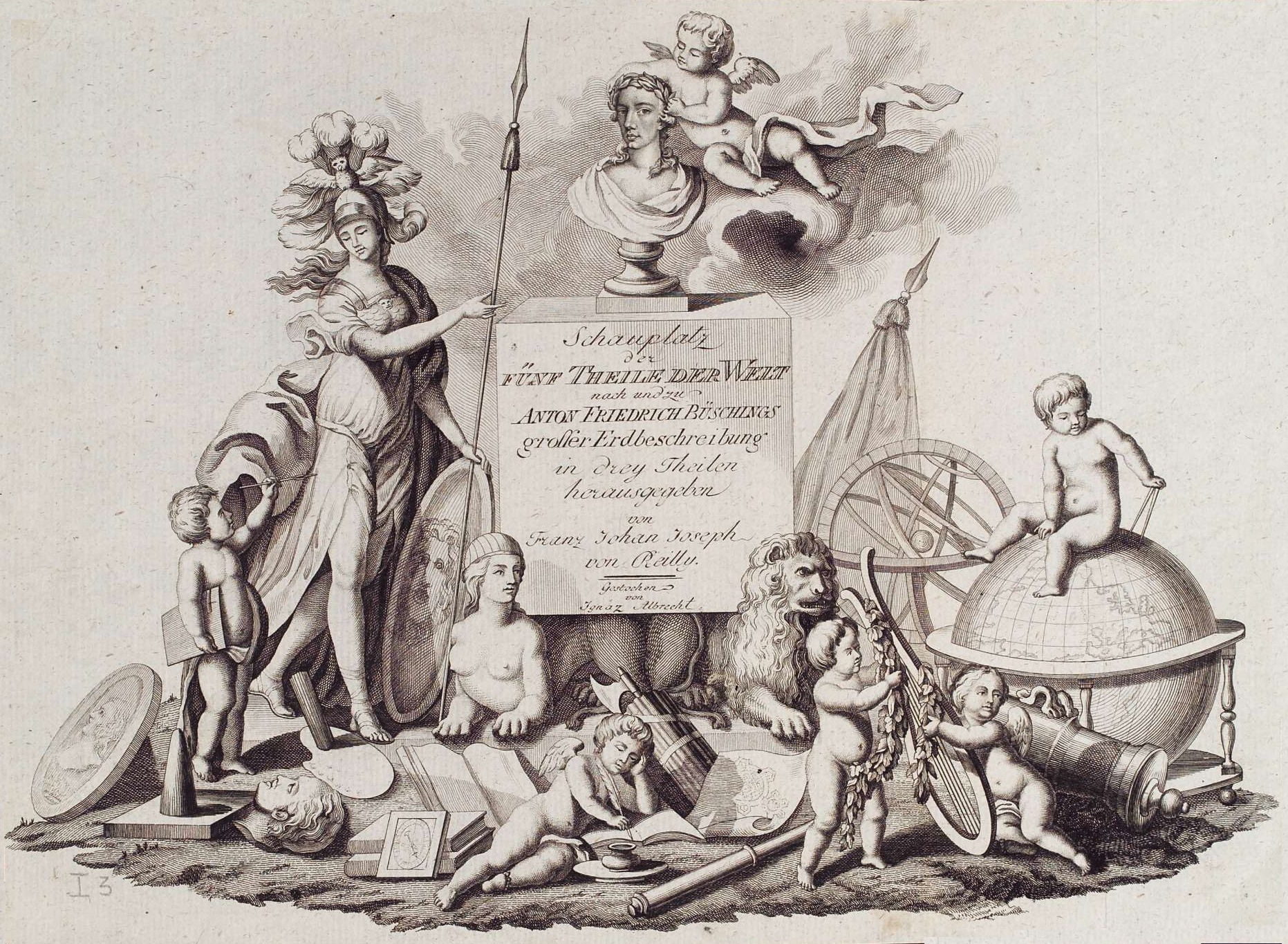
Schauplatz der fünf Theile der Welt nach und zu Anton Friedrich Büschings grosser Erdbeschreibung in drey Theilen herausgegeben von Franz Johann Joseph von Reilly. Engraving by Ignaz Albrecht

[Johann] Ignaz Albrecht (born c. 1759) was an Austrian engraver active from ca. 1789. He is listed as an engraver in the various Viennese Kommerzialschematismen until 1814. The "Verlassenschaftsabhandlungen" and the "Totenbeschauprotokolle" in the Wiener Stadt- und Landesarchiv reveal that two of Albrecht's children died in 1791 and a third died in 1796. During this period the residence of this "Kupferstecher" is given as "auf der Wieden No. 312."

Albrecht engraved almanacs, maps, coats-of-arms, and numerous theater scenes for the multi-volume Theatralische Sammlung (Wien: Joh. Jos. Jahn) from c. 1789-1793. Some 184 of his engravings were published in two volumes as Das Deutsche Theater in Bildern in 1802. He also engraved the Allmanach für Theaterfreunde auf das Jahr 1791, the Atlas von Italien mit einem dazugehörigen nach A. F. Buschings grossen Erdbeschreibung geographischen Anhange in 1796, the Versuch über das Kostüm der vorzüglichsten Volker des Alterthums, des Mittelalter und der neuern Zeiten (3/1798), and Ferdinand Bernhard Vietz's Icones plantarum medico-oeconomico-technologicarum, 1800--.

Albrecht is often confused in the standard biographical literature with the Austrian illustrator, engraver, printer and publisher Ignaz Alberti (1760-1794).
