= Johannes Thienemann =

German ornithologist

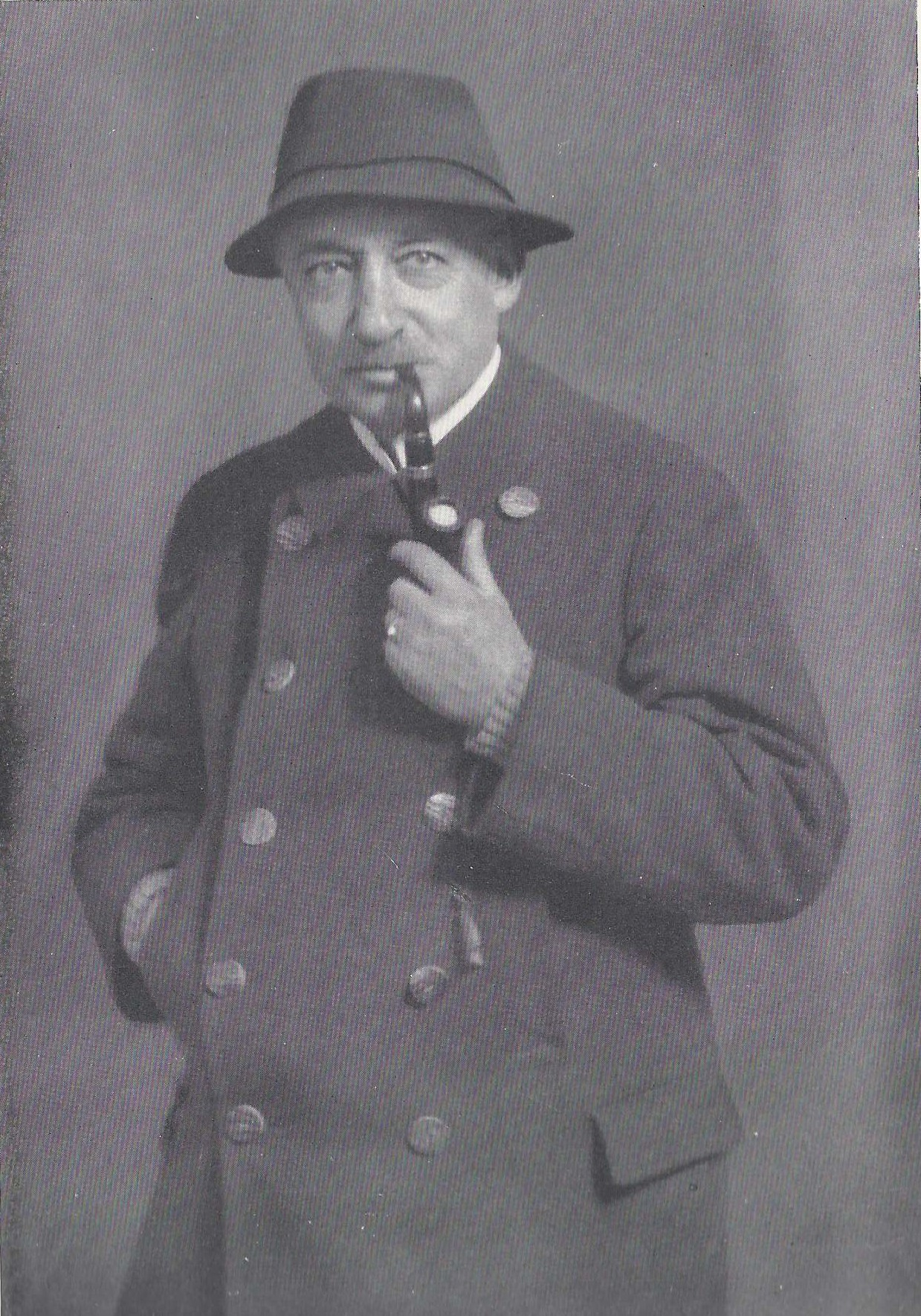
Thienemann c. 1927

Johannes Wilhelm Thienemann (12 November 1863 – 12 April 1938) was a German ornithologist and pastor who established the Rossitten Bird Observatory, the world's first dedicated bird ringing station where he conducted research and popularized bird study.

== Biography ==
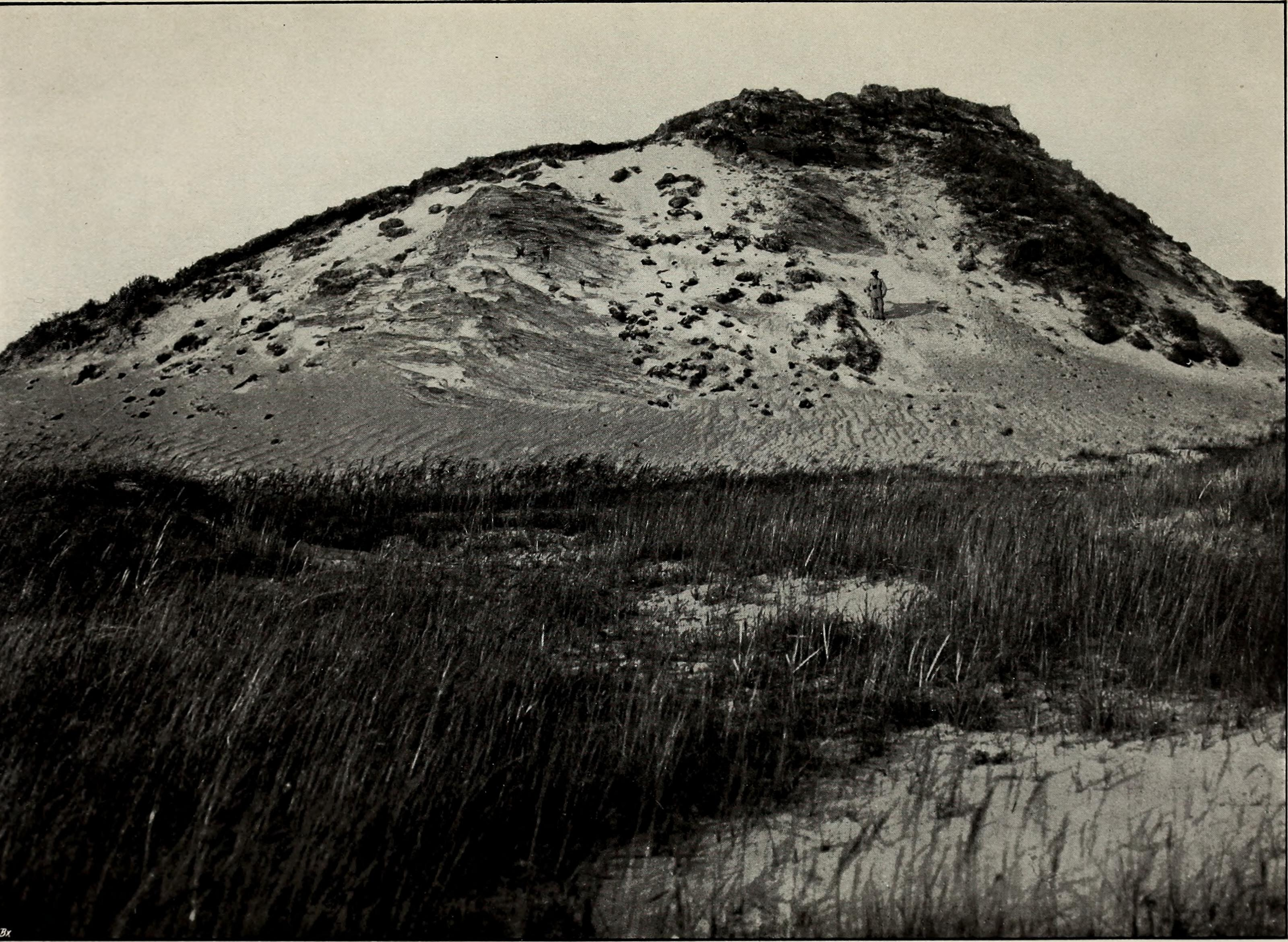
Johannes Thienemann stands on one of the very high dunes at Rossitten 1910.

Thienemann was born in Gangloffsömmern, in the Prussian Province of Saxony. His mother was Anna Zimmer. His father August Wilhelm and his grandfather Georg August Wilhelm were both clergymen with an interest in ornithology. His grandfather had collaborated with Christian Ludwig Brehm and his father attended the first International Ornithologists' Congress at Vienna in 1884. He went to grammar school at Sonderhausen. When the family moved from Gangloffsömmern to Zangenberg near Zeitz he became very interested in the birds around him. He then went to the Zeitz Stiftsgymnasium, graduating in 1885. Thienemann followed the family tradition and trained for the Christian ministry, studying theology at Leipzig and Halle. A church position needed a six-year wait, so he worked as a teacher first at Leipzig and then at the Badersleben Agricultural School. He visited Rossiten on the Curonian Spit in July 1896 and became interested in the study of bird migration.

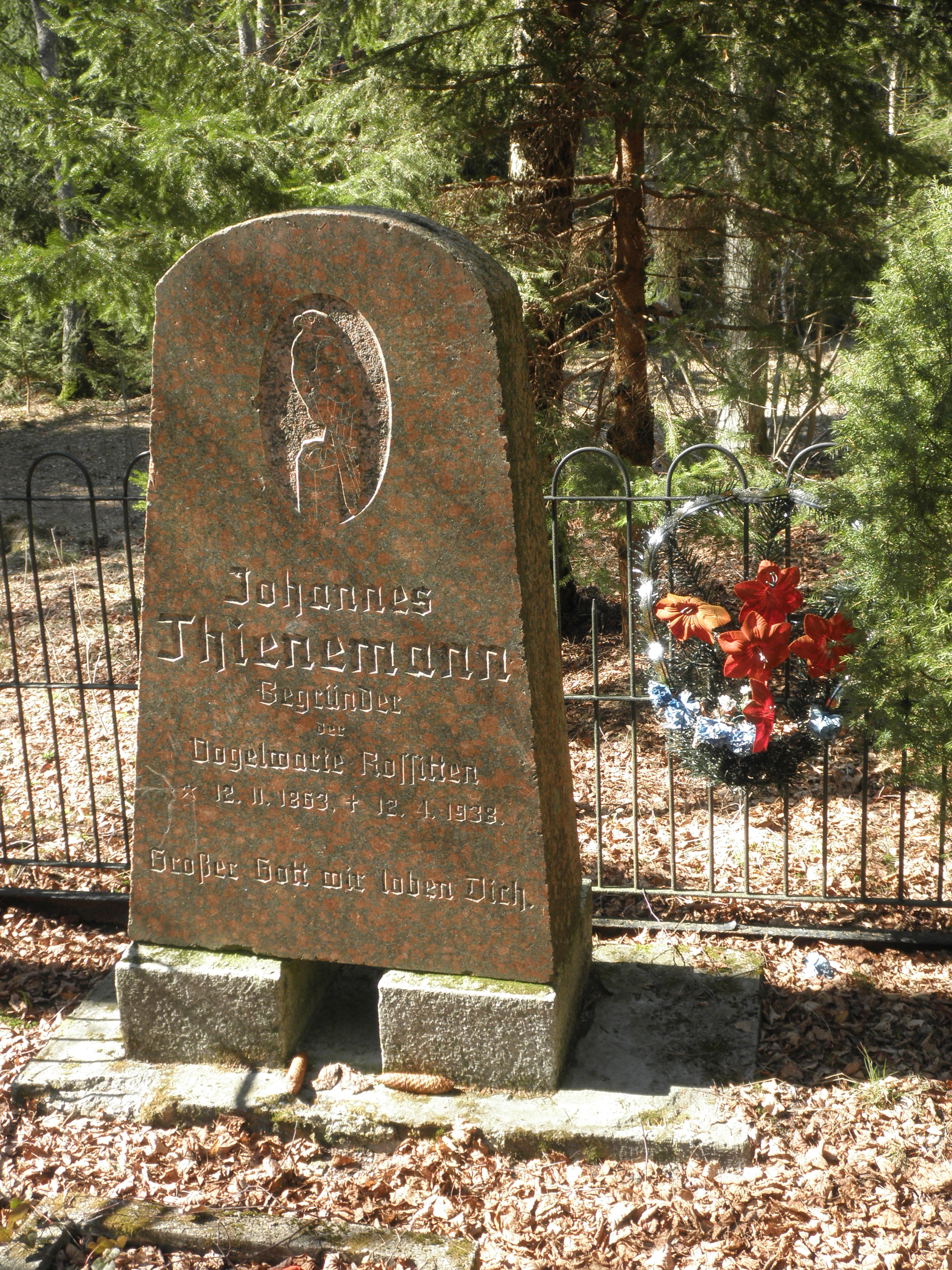
Johannes Thienemann's grave in Rossitten/Rybachy.

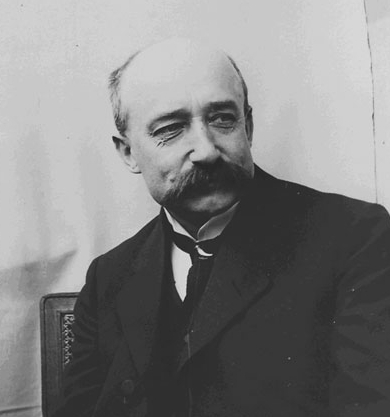
Thienemann in 1912

In 1901 he founded the bird observatory on the Curonian Spit at Rossitten, East Prussia (now Rybachy, Kaliningrad Oblast, Russia). The location had been of interest from the late 1880s, when ornithologists like Friedrich Lindner took an interest in the birds migrating through the region. He was supported by Ernst Ulmer of Quanditten in establishing a field station. Kurt Flöricke, another bird enthusiast had set up a local society of bird enthusiasts (Verein vergnügter Vogelfreunde) in 1890. Flöricke had however not been successful in establishing an observatory and he left, separating from his wife Clara Hedwig Flöricke née Hoffmann (1876-1960) who married Thienemann in 1901. Flöricke was to become a bitter critic of the scientific work of Thienemann. Among Thienemann's attempts was to introduce artificial nest boxes to induce hole-nesting birds to take up residence. He provided sparrow carcasses for tits to feed on in winter and attempted to use artificial floating nest islands for gulls and encouraged the control of foxes and other predators. In 1899 he learnt of the bird ringing project started by Hans Mortensen in Denmark and began ringing and colour marking birds. Some of his early experiments were on ringing crows since they tended to be shot by hunters and traditional "crow-catchers" who then reported the rings. Thienemann was criticized by Hermann Löns. In 1909, anti-vivsectionists joined hands to criticize bird ringing. Thienemann distributed rings to others in the region including wealthy land holders, zoologists and hunters, building up a large network of bird ringers. Thienemann gave talks around the region and collated ring recoveries in annual reports.

Thienemann was also interested in bird flight, and conducted experiments on the altitude at which birds flew in collaboration with the balloonist Friedrich von Lucanus and the gliding pioneer, Ferdinand Schulz. Thienemann was largely self taught but received a degree in zoology at the age of 45. He received a doctorate from the University of Königsberg researching the cestode Taenia tenuicollis under Maximilian Braun in 1906. and was appointed a professor at the University of Königsberg in 1910 but he took little interest in traditional academics. He published on the patterns of their migration based on 35 storks. In the 1920s Thienemann took an interest in falconry. After 1926 Thienemann reared young storks and released them with announcements on the local radio about them leading to widespread interest in birds and their migration.Thienemann worked with formally trained ornithologists including Oskar Heinroth who served for a while as the official director of the observatory. Other ornithologists who worked with him included Ernst Schuz in 1936. Thienemann carried out his ornithological work for the rest of his life, though retiring as director of the observatory in 1929. He died at Rossitten in his 75th year.

== Honours ==
Honours received by Thienemann included:

- Goethe Medal for Art and Science
- Honorary Membership of the Deutsche Ornithologen-Gesellschaft (German Ornithological Society)
- Corresponding Fellowship of the American Ornithologists' Union

== Publications ==
Books authored by Thienemann include:

- 1927 – Rossitten. Drei Jahrzehnte auf der kurischen Nehrung. Neumann: Neudamm. (In German)
- 1931 – Vom Vogelzuge in Rossitten. Neumann: Neudamm. (In German)
- 1935 – Von Elchen, Störchen, Krähen und anderem Getier auf der Kurischen Nehrung. Eichblatt: Leipzig. (In German)
