= Karl Theodor Liebe =

German ornithologist (1828–1894)

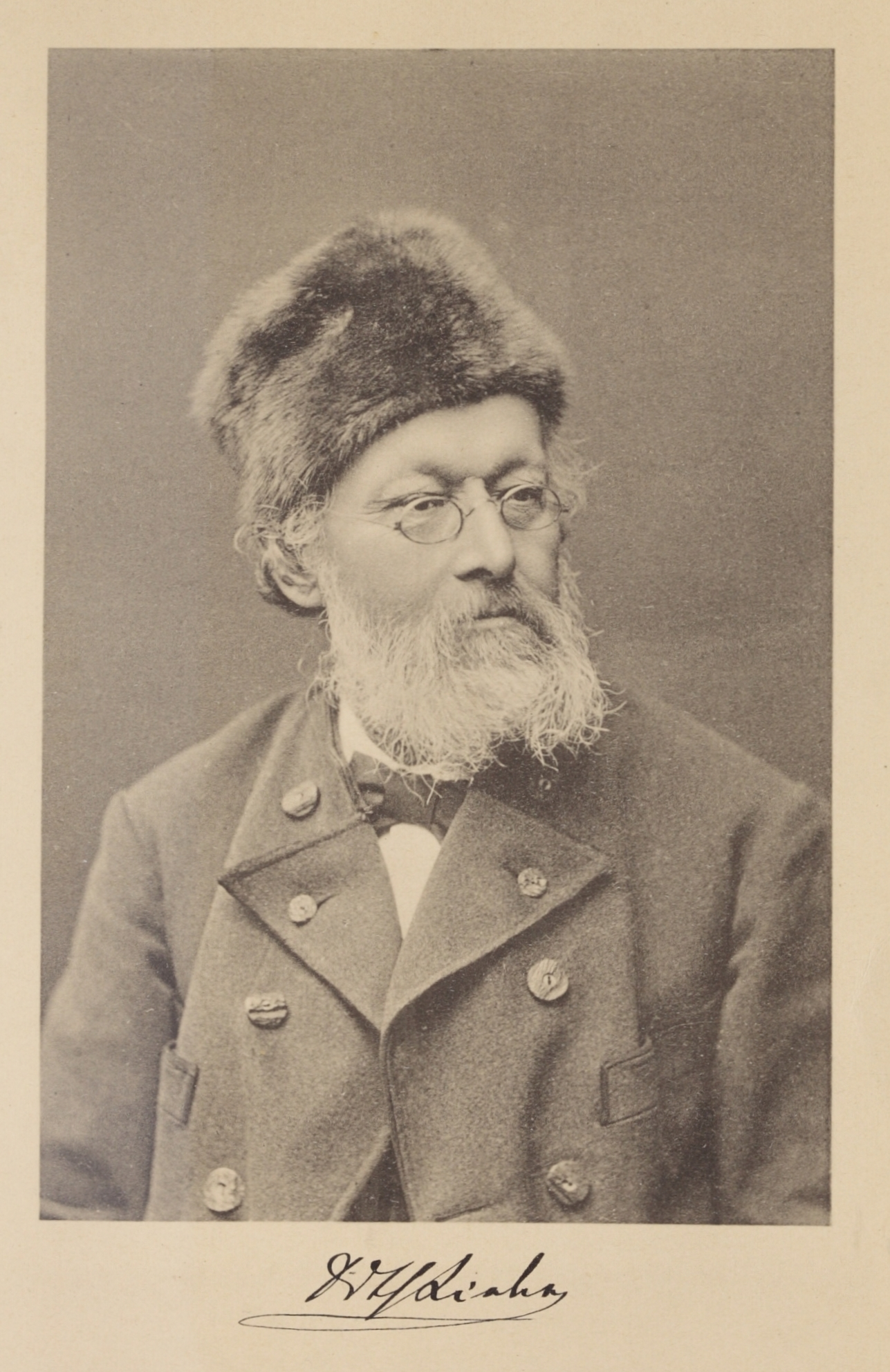
Liebe c. 1886

Karl Theodor Leopold Liebe (11 February 1828 – 5 June 1894) was a German geologist, teacher, and ornithologist. A pioneer in bird conservation, he established the first bird protection agency in Germany.

== Life and work ==
Liebe was born in Neustadt an der Orla. His father Karl Julius was a clergyman at Moderwitz while his grandfather was an eye specialist. His mother Laura was the daughter of an ophthalmologist from Cospoda. A maternal uncle sparked his early interest in natural history. He observed birds in the garden of his grandfather as a boy and visited Christian Ludwig Brehm at Renthendorf. At school he took an interest in geology but was unable to find the means to study Mining and Geology. He studied at Neustadt, Zeitz and Weimar, receiving his school diploma in 1848. Between 1848 and 1852 he studied theology, mathematics and natural science at the University of Jena. The foundations were liberal and included the teachings of Karl Friedrich Bachmann and Ernst Reinhold. During his last semesters he took an interest in botany and pharmacology and attended the lectures of Matthias Jakob Schleiden. He became acquainted with Ernst Erhard Schmid (1815–1885) and took a keen interest in geology against the choice of his father who later accepted his son's interest. He obtained a doctorate for his studies in geology in 1852 under Schmid on the geology of Orlatale. From 1852 to 1855 he taught in Hamburg at Schleidenschen Real high school. In 1855 he took up mathematics teaching at a trade school in Gera. He became an influential teacher and one of his students here Max Fürbringer would become an outstanding systematist. Other students included geologist Ernst Zimmermann (1860–1944) and the physician Carl R. Hennicke (1865–1941). In 1867 he chaired the Gera friends of natural sciences where he gave numerous lectures for the public.

In 1882 Gera witnessed a sinkhole formation and Liebe was involved in explaining the geology and the leaching of underlying gypsum deposits. With his understanding of the gypsum seams and the instability of the dolomite he was able to mark risk zones in the region and advice against construction in those areas.

Liebe observed the birdlife of Thuringia and noted the decline of many species in 1878. He noted the rise of telegraph wires and the injuries they caused to birds. Unlike many of the period he did not reject Darwinian ideas outright. He founded the German Society for Bird Protection in the same year which helped in establishing the Imperial Law on Bird Protection in 1888. In 1891 Liebe criticised the use of economic reasons for bird protection at the Budapest International Ornithological Congress. He saw aesthetic and moral reasons for the protection of birds as being of foremost importance.

Liebe was married to Emilie née Weißker from 1865, who took a major role in the care of birds in his private aviary, and they had no children. He retired in 1894 due to poor health and received a Gold Cross of Merit. He suffered from pulmonary emphysema and died on the morning of June 5, just three months after retiring. He was buried in the Trinity Cemetery now called the youth park. The grave was removed an in 1935 a new memorial stone was placed.

In 1929 a bird exhibition was held in Gera and a memorial plaque was placed on his home. The inauguration of the plaque was by Oskar and Magdalena Heinroth along with Carl R. Hennicke and Ernst Zimmermann. The State Gymnasium 4 in Gera was named after him as the Karl-Theodor-Liebe Gymnasium on October 2, 1992.

== Writings ==
- Liebe, Karl Theodor (1893). Ornithologische Schriften. Gesammelt und herausgegeben von Carl R. Hennicke. Leipzig: Verlag von W. Malende.
