= August Wilhelm Thienemann =

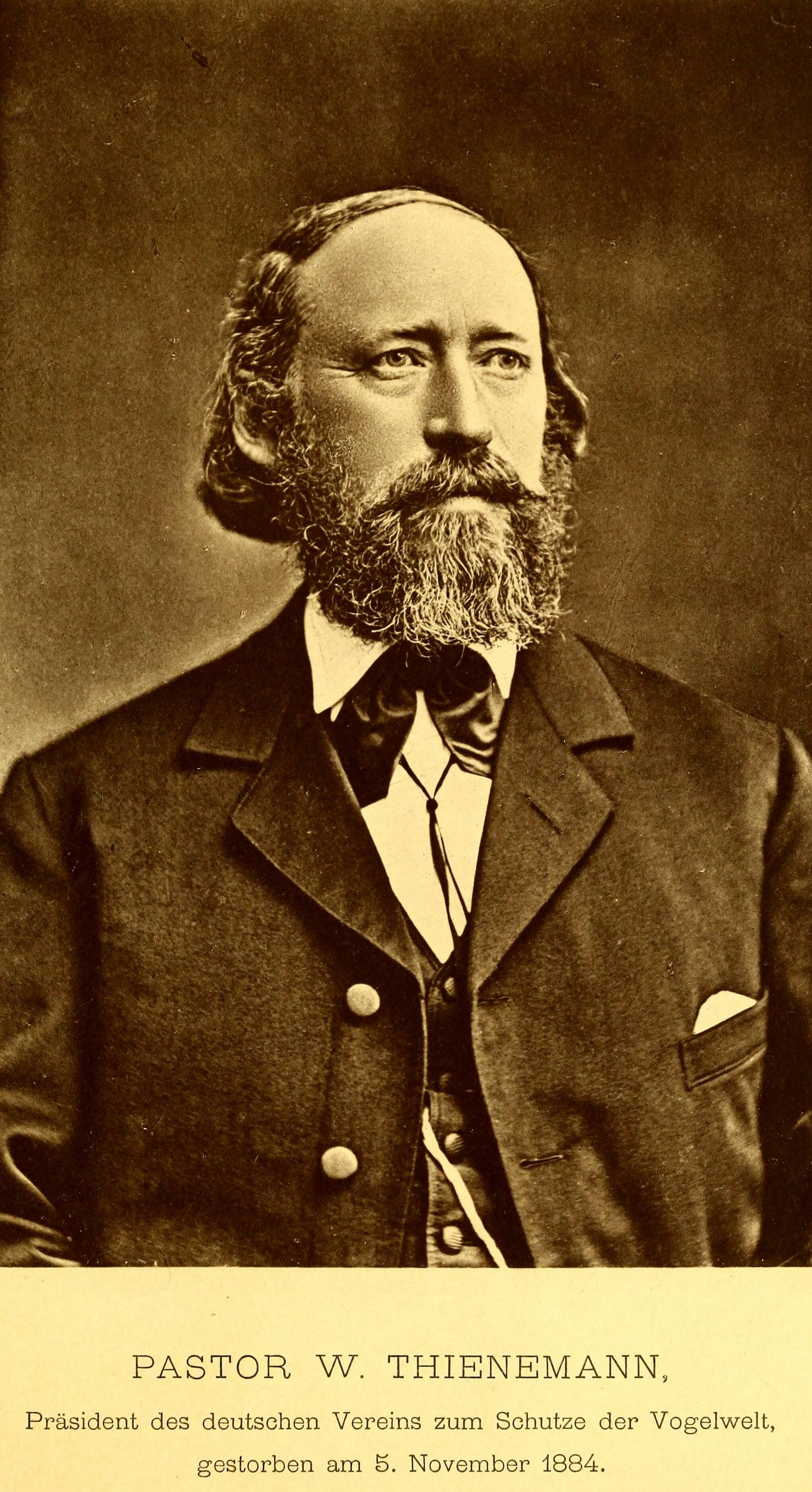
August Wilhelm Thienemann (1830–1884)

August Wilhelm Thienemann (24 April 1830 – 5 November 1884) was a German pastor, ornithologist and conservationist. He was the father of Johannes Wilhelm Thienemann, the pioneer of bird ringing in Germany and the founder of the Rossiten bird observatory.

== Life and work ==
Thienemann was born on 24 April 1830 in Droyßig where his father Georg August Wilhelm Thienemann (1781–1863) was a pastor who also took an interest in natural history with a circle of friends who included Johann Friedrich Naumann (1780–1857) and Christian Ludwig Brehm (1787–1864). His grandfather Johann August Thienemann (1749–1812) was also a naturalist as was his uncle Friedrich August Ludwig Thienemann (1793–1858), whose son was Ludwig Thienemann (1793–1858). As a boy August Wilhelm collected bird eggs, shells and other objects. He studied theology and became a pastor at Gangloffsömmern. When he became a rector at Zangenberg near Zeitz, he managed a large aviary with numerous birds and documented the calls of birds often making use of a tuning fork to identify the frequencies. From 1876 the journal Sächsisch-Thüringischen Vereins für Vogelkunde und Vogelschutz zu Halle was edited by Eugen Dietrich Adalbert von Schlechtendal (1830–1881). After his death, Thienemann took over editing of the journal which had then merged into the German association for the protection of birds. Thienemann also edited the monthly magazine for the German association for the protection of birds. He produced a mural for a school in Weissenfels dealing with birds and gave talks around Germany. In 1884 he was asked by the minister of agriculture to represent Prussia at the International Ornithological Congress at Vienna but Theinemann was unable to go due to poor health. Theinemann suffered from rheumatism and had suffered a heart attack once in 1878.

Thienemann died on 5 November 1884 in Zangenberg at the age of 54.
