= Joachim Johann Nepomuk Spalowsky =

Austrian naturalist and polymath

Prodromus in Systema Historicum Testaceorum, published by the widow of Ignaz Alberti (1795)

Joachim Anton Johann Nepomuk Spalowsky (1752 Vienna – 1797 Vienna) was an naturalist and polymath who lived in Vienna.

"He was a surgeon attached to the civic regiments of Vienna."

Spalowsky's 1795 treatise on conchology, Prodromus in Systema Historicum Testaceorum, published by the widow of Ignaz Alberti, includes original descriptions of several new species. He also wrote works on birds, plants, and mammals, including Beytrag zur Naturgeschichte der Vögel (1790–95).

He was a Member of the Royal Czech Society of Sciences.
