= Ignaz Alberti =

Austrian illustrator

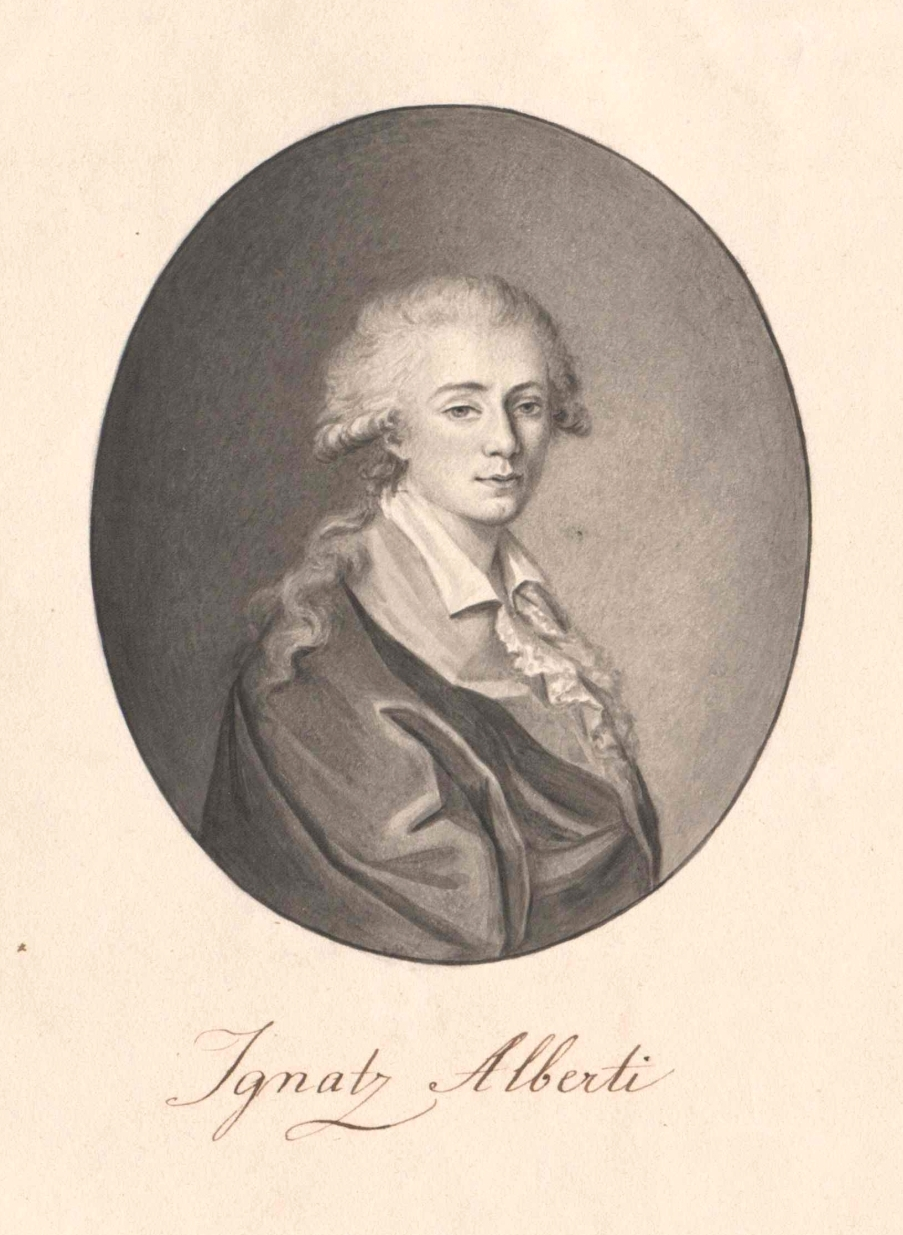
Ignaz Alberti

Ignaz Alberti (11 April 1760 – 31 August 1794) was an Austrian illustrator, engraver and book printer. He employed some 20 engravers in 1787 who applied their skills to cartography and botanical books. After his death his widow managed the printing and publication.

== Life ==
Alberti was born on 11 April 1760 in Vienna.

His 1796 Vienna edition of the New Testament was printed and published by his widow, was banned by the Catholic Church, and appeared without imprimatur.

Alberti engraved and printed the frontispiece for the original libretto of Mozart's Die Zauberflöte in Vienna in 1791. He was one of Mozart's fellow Masons in the Lodge Zur gekrönten Hoffung. The frontispiece was so richly embellished with Masonic symbolism that it was removed from all subsequent editions of the libretto.

Another publication to which Mozart contributed his final three lieder (K. 596-8), was the Liedersammlung für Kinder und Kinderfreunde am Clavier published in 1791 by Ignaz Alberti – this was the first in a set of four volumes of children’s songs to be published in Vienna.

Alberti was instrumental in the preparing, printing and publishing many volumes on natural history, librettos, oratory and other topics. Among these were:

- Joachim Johann Nepomuk Spalowsky's "Prodromus in Systema Historicum Testaceorum" published posthumously in 1795 by his widow.
- Mauerrede auf Mozarts Tod 1792
- Dankopfer Franz dem Zweyten, Kaiser der Deutschen 1792
- Die ganze heilige Schrift, nach der in der Katholischen Kirche 1791-3
- Ovid's Verwandlungen in Kupfern und mit den nöthigen erlaäuterungen versehen heraus gegeben von einer Gesellschaft 1791–93.
- Emanuel Schikaneder's Die Zauberflöte 1791.
- Liedersammlung für Kinder und Kinderfreunde am Clavier 1791.
- Trauerrede auf Joseph II. zur Gedächtnisfeier gehalten in einer Versammlung der F. M. in derLoge zur gekr. Hofn. im Or. zu Wien 1790.

Alberti died on 31 August 1794 in Vienna.

== Gallery ==
Publications - selection

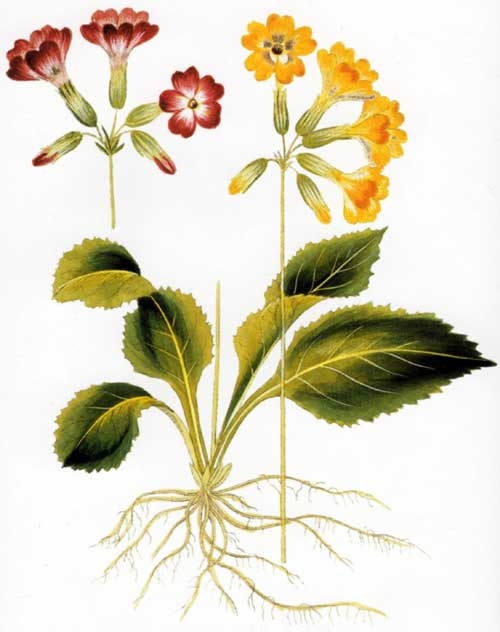
Primula elatior
Icones Plantarum Medico-Oeconomico-Technologicarum

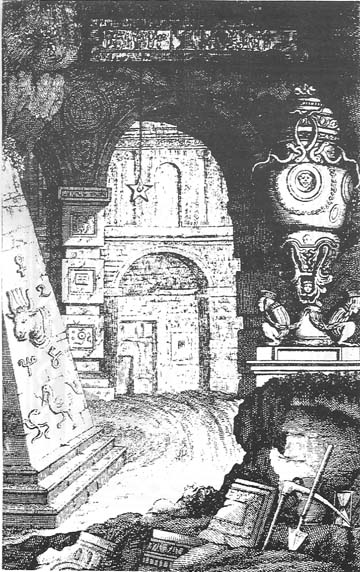
Frontispiece of the first edition of Die Zauberflöte (1791)

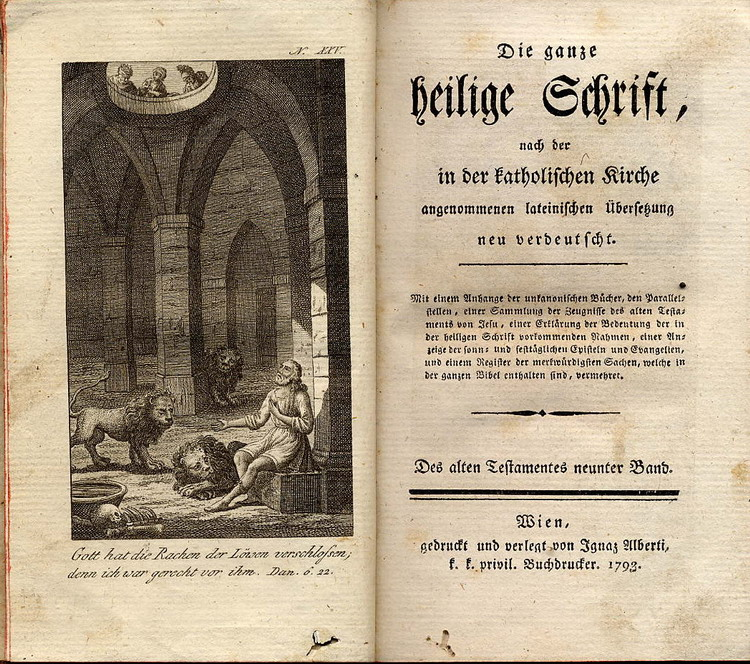
Old Testament published in Vienna (1793)

Joachim Johann Nepomuk Spalowsky's "Prodromus in Systema Historicum Testaceorum" (1795)
