= Friedrich von Lucanus =

Friedrich von Lucanus (20 June 1869, Berlin - 18 February 1947, Buschow), full name Friedrich Karl Hermann von Lucanus, was a German professional soldier (Oberstleutnant a.D.; Dr.h.c.) ornithologist, ethologist and author of popular scientific animal books. He was President of the German Ornithologists' Society from 1921 to 1926 and a Corresponding Fellow of the American Ornithologists' Union.

== Works ==
- Das Leben der Vögel. A. Scherl, Berlin, 1925
- Tier und Jagd. Berlin, 1926
- Im Zauber des Tierlebens. Volksverband der Bücherfreunde, Wegweiser-Verlag, Berlin, 1926
- Naturdenkmäler aus der deutschen Vogelwelt. H. Bermühler, Berlin-Lichterfelde, 1927
- Die Rätsel des Vogelzuges. (1. Aufl. 1922.) 3., verm u. verb. Aufl., H. Beyer & Söhne, Langensalza, 1929
- Zugvögel und Vogelzug. Julius Springer, Berlin, 1929
- Deutschlands Vogelwelt. Parey, Berlin, 1937
