= Kurt Floericke =

German naturalist

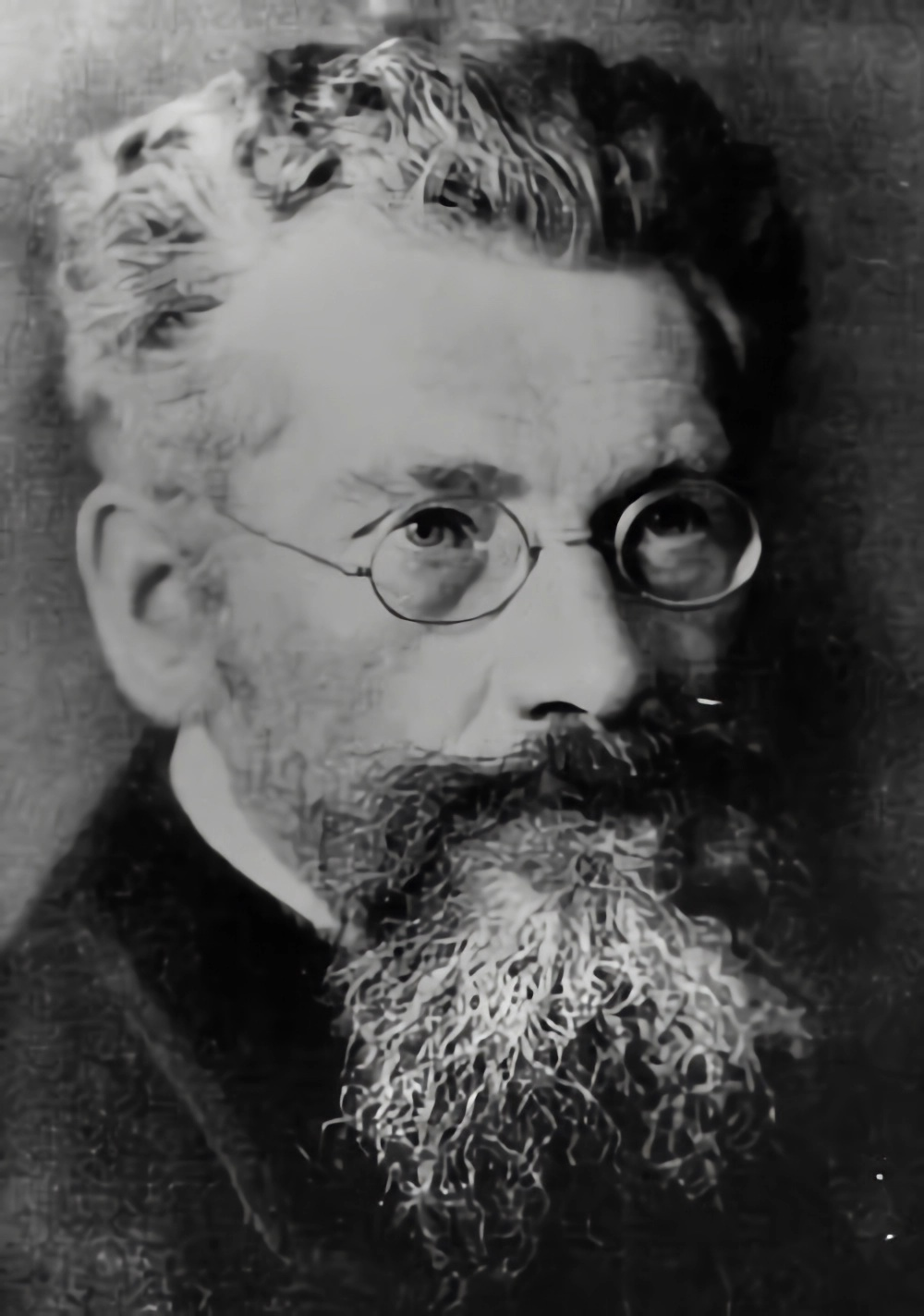
Kurt Ehrenreich Floericke around 1914

Kurt Ehrenreich Floericke (also spelled Curt and/or Flöricke; 23 March 1869, in Zeitz – 29 October 1934, in Stuttgart) was a German naturalist and author of numerous popular science books. He also edited the Kosmos magazine in Stuttgart from 1907. An early advocate of bird protection, he sought the establishment of a bird sanctuary on Lake Constance.

== Life and work ==
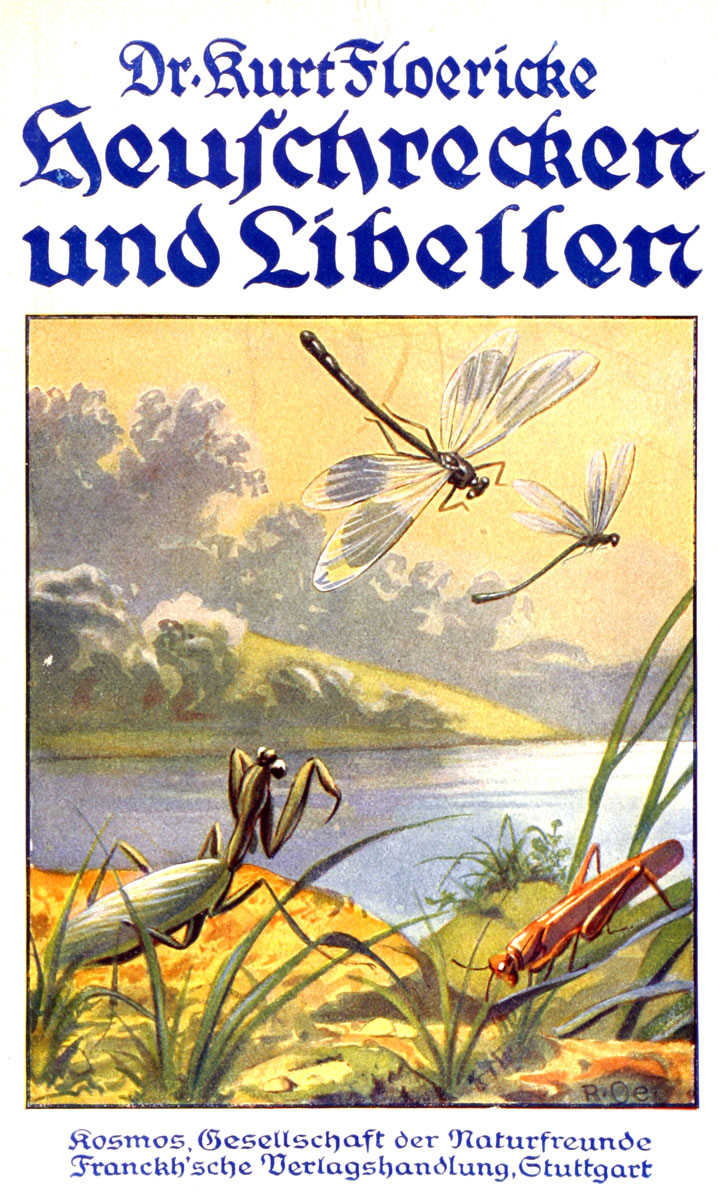
Cover of Heuschrecken und Libellen (1922)

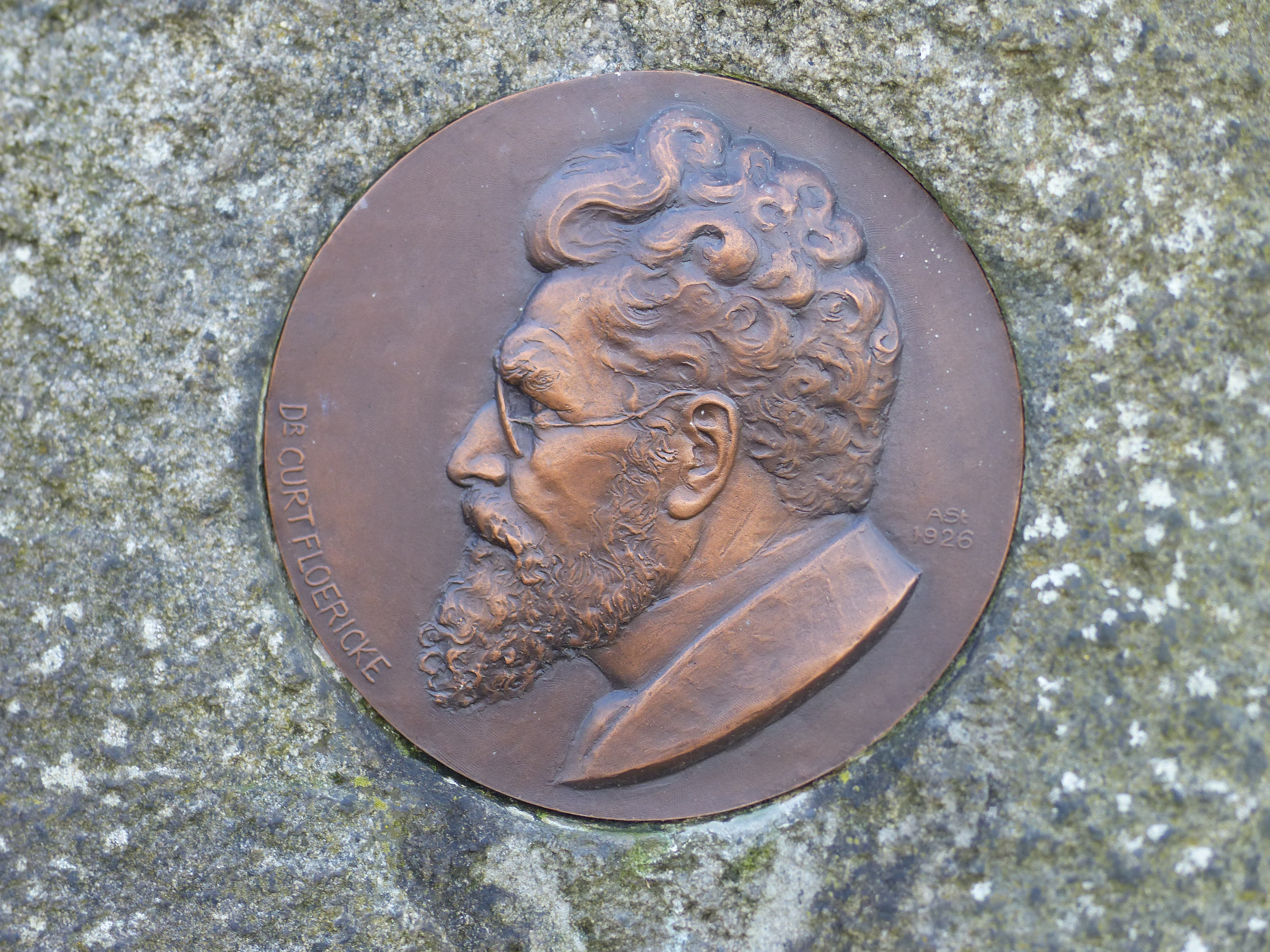
Profile on grave in Pragfriedhof, Stuttgart

Floericke was born in Zeitz to Kurt Paul from Brandenburg and Selma Berta née Hüller from Thuringia. He became interested in nature early and went to study the natural sciences in Marburg and Breslau. From 1889, Floericke studied natural sciences in Breslau and Marburg and he gained a doctorate in 1893 in Marburg with a thesis on the bird fauna of Silesia and worked as an assistant to Richard Greef. He spent 1894 to spring 1897 in Rossiten where he founded an association for bird enthusiasts, Verein vergnügter Vogelfreunde. Floericke hoped to establish a research station but he was unable to raise funds. In 1897, Johannes Thienemann was able to raise funds and took over Floericke's project. Floericke also separated from his wife, who married Thienemann. Disappointed by all this Floericke began to travel across Bosnia, Herzegovina, Bulgaria, Cyprus, Asia Minor and Palestine. He remained a harsh critic of Thienemann. He then extended his studies to east and south-east Europe, North Africa, the Middle East, and South America. In 1902, he moved to Vienna, where he made a living as an author. He also married Melanie Reiß (1881–1971). His financial position was assured when he became the editor and owner of Kosmos Die Zeitschrift für alle Freunde der Natur ("Kosmos Magazine for the Friends of Nature" 1904-, Stuttgart). Floericke inspired the formation of the Süddeutsche Vogelwarte, the South German Ornithological Institute and was involved in establishing a bird observatory at Radolfzell on Lake Constance. He promoted the view that nature was self-regulating and did not need management by humans. During World War I, he wrote on the wartime powers, campaigns and battles.

Floericke was a Freemason and belonged to the "Masonic Association of the Rising Sun" and published the magazine "Sonnenstrahlen" from 1908 to 1922. He died from malaria contracted on his travels and died in Stuttgart.

== Bibliography ==
Floericke wrote extensively, more than 100 books and 800 articles. His books included:

- Einheimische Fische (1913)
- Schnecken und Muscheln (1920)
- Spinnen und Spinnenleben (1921)
- Allerlei Gewürm (1921)
- Heuschrecken und Libellen (1922)
- Falterleben (1923)
- Aussterbende Tiere (1927)

In his 1922 book Dr. Kurt Floerickes Vogelbuch, he was among the first to note predation of nestling birds by slugs (Arion sp.).

== Other sources ==
- Andreas Daum, Wissenschaftspopularisierung im 19. Jahrhundert: Bürgerliche Kultur, naturwissenschaftliche Bildung und die deutsche Öffentlichkeit, 1848–1914. Munich: Oldenbourg, 1998, ISBN 3-486-56337-8, 2nd. edition 2002, including a short biography.
- Ulrich Franke: Dr. Curt Floericke - Naturforscher, Ornithologe, Schriftsteller. Mit der ersten umfassenden Bibliographie seiner Schriften. 2009. ISBN 978-3-8370-8545-7
