= Heligoland trap =

Large, building-sized, funnel-shaped trap for birds

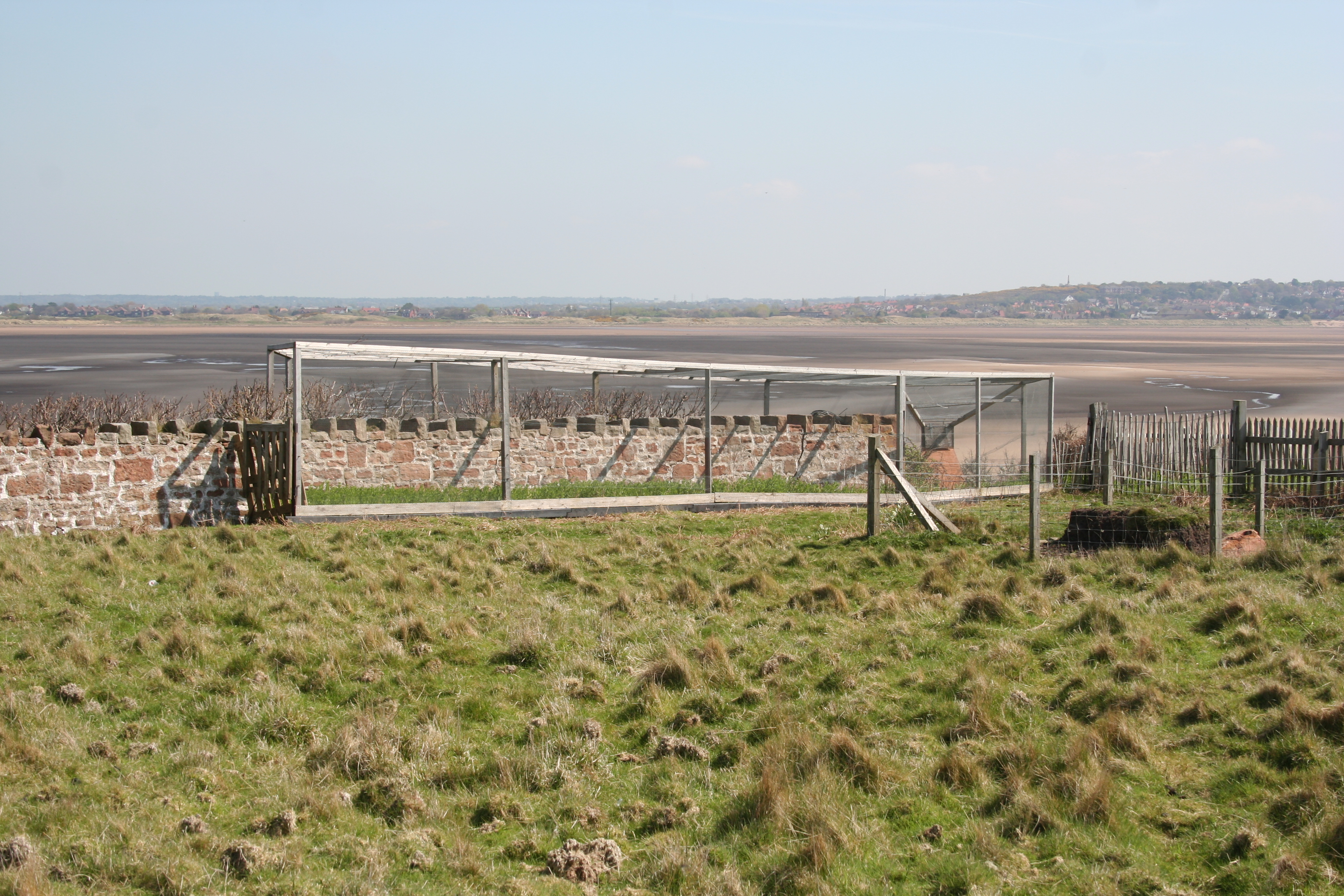
A small Heligoland trap on Hilbre Island, Wirral, England

A Heligoland trap (or funnel trap) is a large, building-sized, funnel-shaped, rigid structure of wire mesh or netting used to trap birds, so that they can be banded or otherwise studied by ornithologists.

The name is taken from the site of the first such trap, the Heligoland Bird Observatory on the island of Heligoland, Germany, where it was developed by Hugo Weigold who established the observatory and initiated the banding program there. The trap has a series of linked funnels that guides birds or other animals in but makes it hard for them to leave. Funnel traps of smaller size can also be used to trap squirrels and insects.

== Rybachy trap ==
The Rybachy trap is a variation or expansion of the Heligoland trap in that it is a large, passive trap consisting of linked funnels terminating in a small chamber from which the birds are extracted for banding and measuring before release. It differs in being larger – it may have an entrance some 30 m wide by 15 m high – and by having a non-rigid body made of netting rather than wire mesh. It was developed in 1957 by Janis Jakšisat under the leadership of Lev Belopolsky at the Rybachy Biological Station (formerly the Rossitten Bird Observatory) at Rybachy, Kaliningrad Oblast in Russia, on the Curonian Spit.

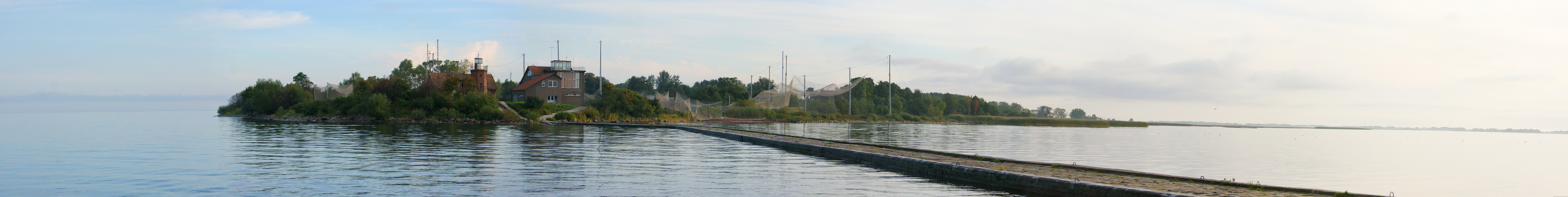
Ventė Cape (Lithuania) on an autumn morning, with Heligoland traps visible on the right

== See also ==
- Duck decoy
