= Ernst Schüz =

German ornithologist (1901–1991)

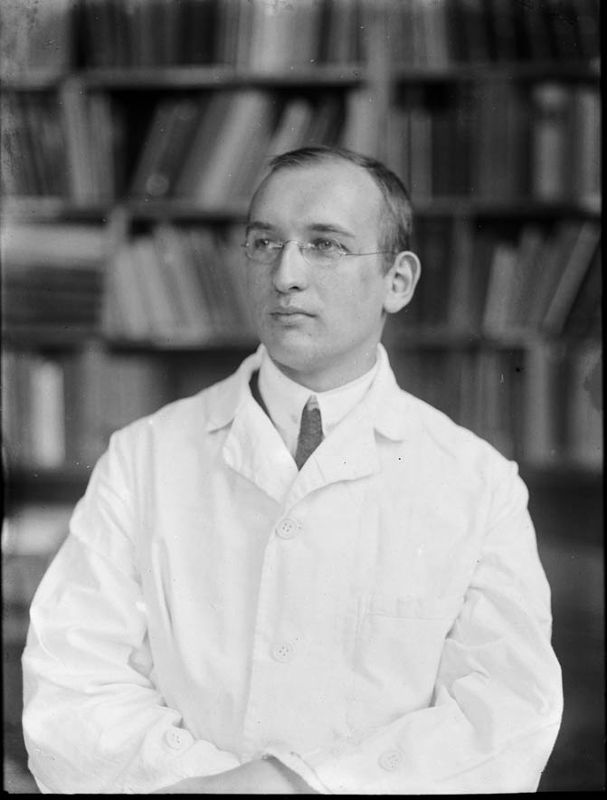
Ernst Schüz in 1920

Ernst Paul Theodor Schüz (24 October 1901 – 8 August 1991) was a German ornithologist and a curator at the natural history museum in Stuttgart. He was known for his extensive work at the Rossiten bird observatory, particularly for his studies on white storks. He also helped establish the Radolfzell ornithological observatory, which is now a part of the Max Planck Institut.

== Life and work ==
Schüz was born in Markgröningen where his namesake father was a pastor. His mother was Elise Weitbrecht. After schooling at the Charles Gymnasium in Stuttgart, he went on to study at the University of Tübingen. He went on to study at the University of Berlin under Erwin Stresemann, receiving a doctorate in 1927. His research was on powder down feathers. He worked at the natural history museums at Hanover and Dresden and worked at the Rossitten Bird Observatory from 1929 under Oskar Heinroth. From 1936 he headed the Rossitten observatory and organized coordinated ringing studies on white storks and grey herons. He also conducted experiments on migration, orientation, and physiology in starlings along with Werner Rüppell and Paul Putzig. In 1943, he was drafted into the war. After the war, he established the Radolfzell ornithological observatory along with Nikolaus von Bodman. Schüz helped integrate the observatory into the Max Planck Society. in 1959. From 1959 he served as director of the State Museum of Natural History at Stuttgart. He was an honorary professor at the University of Stuttgart. Peter Berthold became one of the doctoral students of Schüz.

Schüz's early work was on migration and he published an atlas of bird migration in 1931 along with Hugo Weigold. In 1942 he was asked to evaluate a proposal (Storchbein Propaganda or "stork-leg propaganda") by Heinrich Himmler to use storks reared in Rossiten for German war propaganda. They were to carry propaganda to be delivered to the Boers in South Africa. Schüz pointed out that the recovery rate was less than 1%, which meant that more than a 1000 storks would be needed to deliver about 10 leaflets, which led the idea to be shelved. He later worked on demographics, physiology, and conservation. One of Schüz's important experimental studies was on white storks. Schüz's predecessor and founder of the Rossitten Observatory, Johannes Thienemann, had found that birds breeding in eastern Prussia migrated southeast, while those in the west migrated southwest. Schüz took young storks from the eastern part of this migratory divide and moved them to the western side and found that they took a southwesterly route and apparently followed the adults. He however conducted another experiment where the young were released only after all the adults had migrated and found that the eastern storks raised in the west chose an apparently innate southeasterly route.

He married Tabitha Brenner in 1926; she died in 1941 shortly after the birth of their third child. He married Hanna Steinheil in 1944.
