= Nikolay Belkov =

- Born: Nikolay Sergeevich Belkov; 1950; Leningrad, USSR
- Known for: System of Pictograms for the Olympic Games in 1980
- Style: Artist
- Awards: Medal For Distinguished Labour

Nikolay Sergeevich Belkov (5 September 1950, Leningrad, the USSR – 21 May 1996) was a Russian graphic designer, member of the Union of Artists of Russia and designer of pictograms used at the 1980 Summer Olympic Games in Moscow, Russia. He participated in Leningrad, all-Russian, all-Union, international exhibitions and International Poster Biennale. Belkov was awarded the medal "For Distinguished Labour".

== Biography ==
Nikolay Belkov was born in 1950 in Leningrad. He was fascinated by pentathlon and trained under pentathlon Olympic Сhampion A.A. Tarasov. Belkov mastered the sport and had every chance to enter the national team of the USSR.

== Creation of System of Pictograms for the Olympic Games in 1980 ==
In 1977, Nikolay Belkov graduated from the evening department of the faculty of industrial art of Leningrad Higher Art and Industrial School named after V. I. Mukhina. His graduated work was dedicated to a system of pictograms developed by him for all Olympic Sports for the 1980s Olympic Games.

After finishing his studies at the school, Nikolay Belkov chose to design a set of equipment for pentathletes as his graduation project. Together with this, he worked on the creation of emblems of the five sports included in the pentathlon. Having developed dozens of options, he at some point caught the General principle of graphic construction. In this regard, the idea was born to try to portray all sports as icons. Schematic images of different sports were once used at the Olympics in London, Tokyo, Munich, Montreal. Nikolay studied the experience of foreign designers in detail and contrasted their dancing men with a new system of symbols. The basis for the work was the famous system of icons designed by Otto Aicher that was created for the Olympics in Munich.

The system of pictograms was patented and implemented at the Olympic Games in Moscow in 1980. The graduated work on its development became one of the final works of the Stieglitz Academy.

== School of Leningrad Poster Art ==
As a member of the Union of Artists, Nikolay Belkov, along with other artists, was at the origins of the art movement that formed the Leningrad School of Poster Art.
