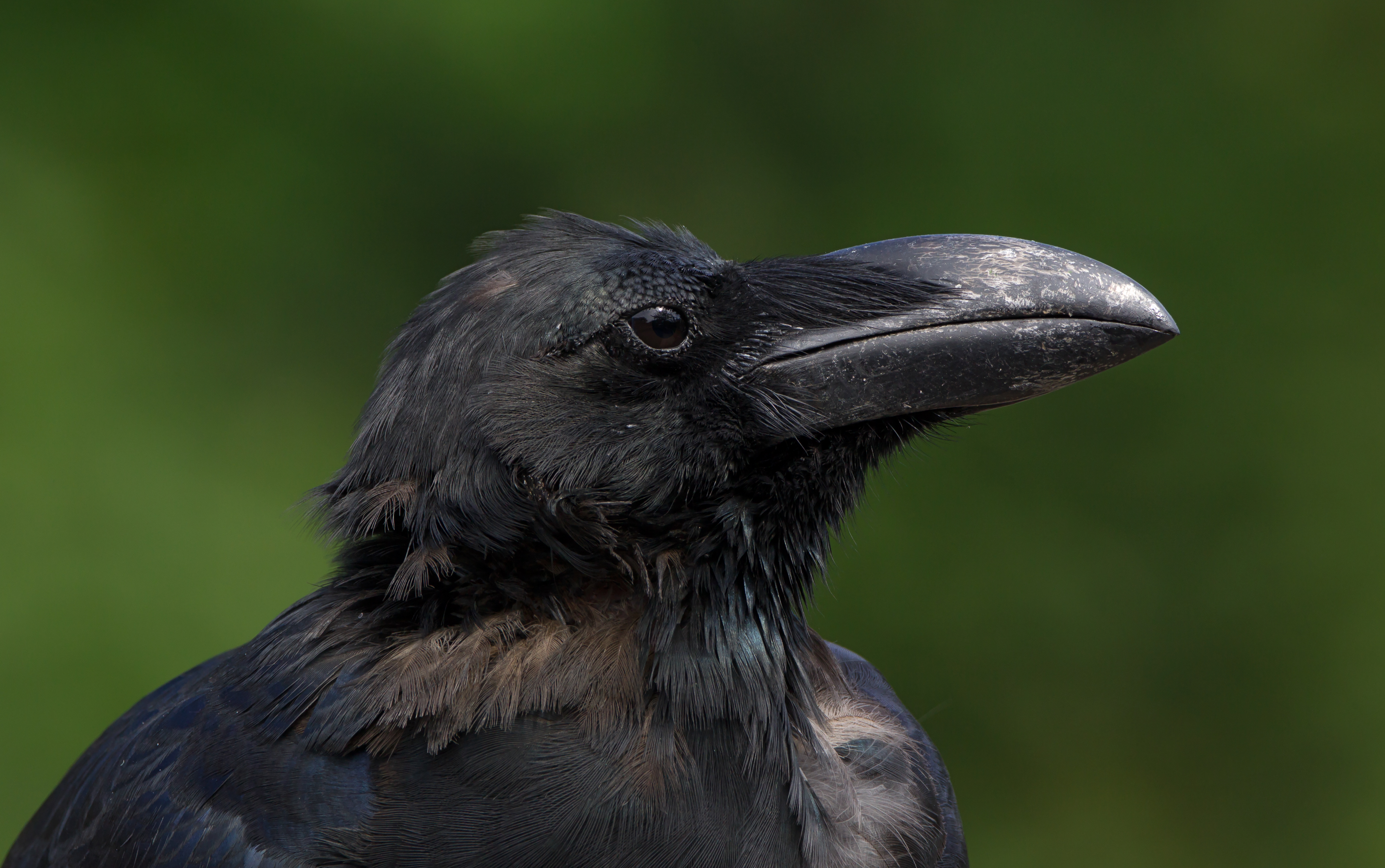
- C. m. japonensis at Tennōji Park in Osaka, Japan

Conservation status
- Least Concern (IUCN 3.1)

Scientific classification
- Kingdom: Animalia
- Phylum: Chordata
- Class: Aves
- Order: Passeriformes
- Family: Corvidae
- Genus: Corvus
- Species: C. macrorhynchos

Binomial name
- Corvus macrorhynchos Wagler, 1827
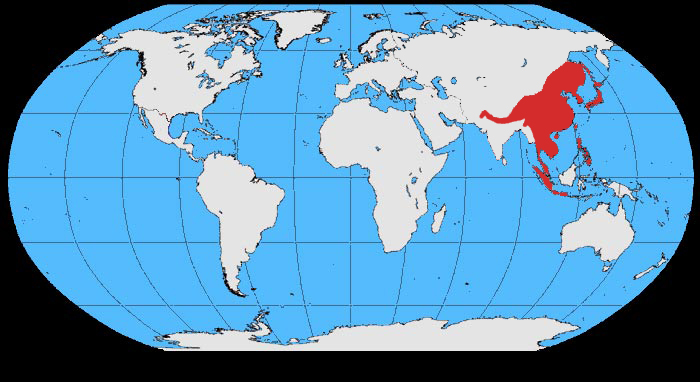
- Range

= Large-billed crow =

Species of bird

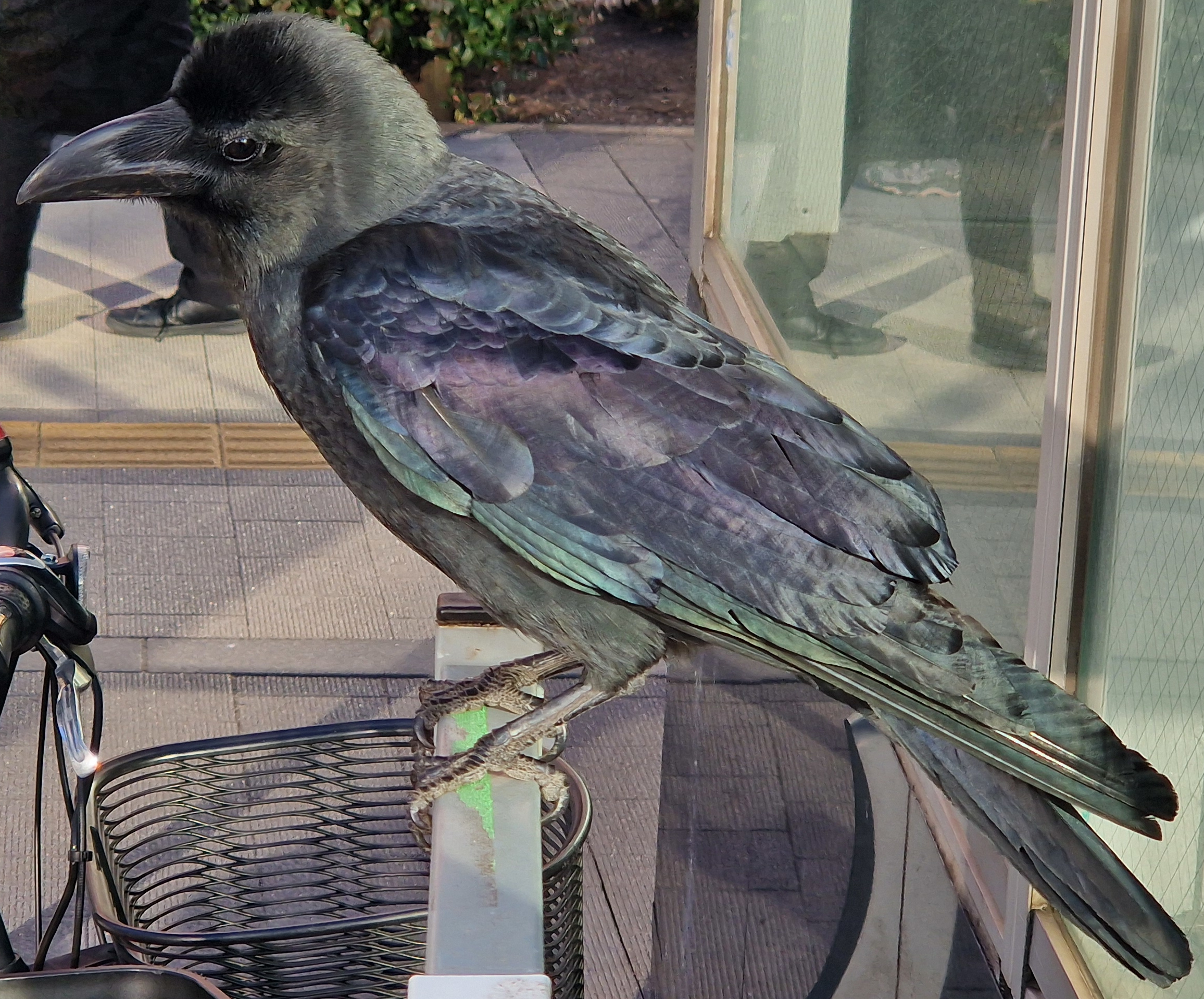
Large-billed crow in Tokyo, Japan. Note the robust beak, rounded head and iridescent black plumage.

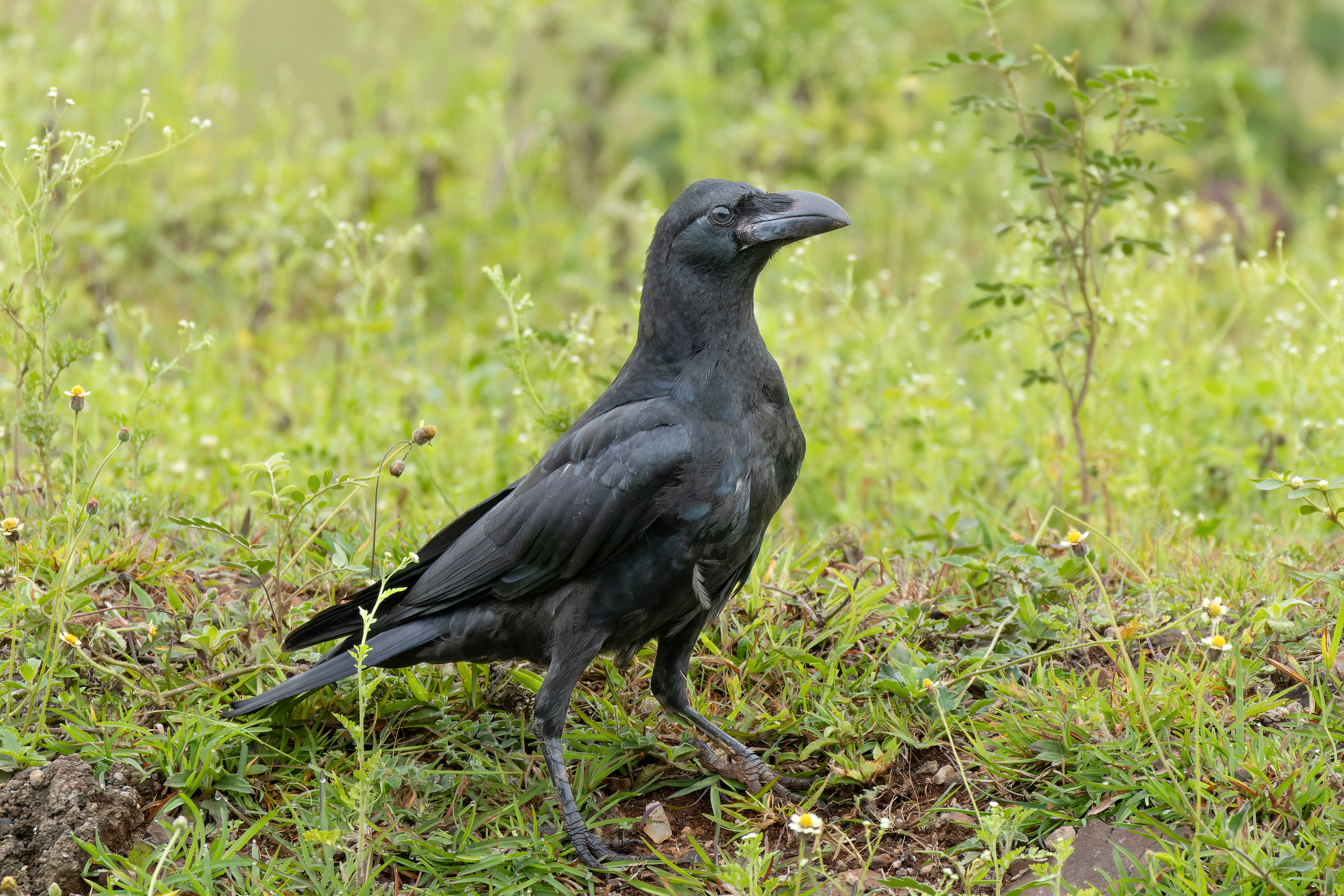
In Bhigwan, Maharashtra, India.

The large-billed crow (Corvus macrorhynchos), formerly referred to widely as the jungle crow, is a widespread Asian species of crow. It is very adaptable and is able to survive on a wide range of food sources, making it capable of colonizing new areas, due to which it is often considered a nuisance, especially on islands. It has a large bill, which is the source of its scientific name macrorhynchos (Ancient Greek for "long-billed") and it is sometimes known by the common name thick-billed crow. It can also be mistaken for a common raven. The eastern jungle crow and Indian jungle crow were once considered conspecific and together called the jungle crow.

== Taxonomy ==
The large-billed crow was formally described in 1837 by the German naturalist Johann Georg Wagler under the current binomial name Corvus macrorhynchos. The type locality is the island of Java. The specific epithet macrorhynchos is from Ancient Greek μακρορρυγχος/makrorrhunkhos meaning "long-billed".

The taxonomy has a long and complicated history, and is still not fully resolved. Although ornithologists suspect that several species may be involved, the species limits are uncertain as each of the published studies only samples a few of the taxa.

Early in the 20th century the large-billed crow together with the Bismarck crow (Corvus insularis), Torresian crow (Corvus orru), little crow (Corvus bennetti) and Philippine jungle crow (Corvus philippinus) were all considered to be conspecific with the Australian raven (Corvus coronoides). In 1929 the German ornithologist Ernst Hartert split the expanded Corvus coronoides into several species based on the size of the throat hackles and the colour of the base of the neck feathers.

Ten subspecies are recognised. Some are distinctive vocally, morphologically and genetically, leading to treatments that raise some of them into species status.

- C. m. japonensis Bonaparte, CLJL, 1850 – Sakhalin, Kuril Islands, and northern Japan. (includes hondoensis and borealis)
- C. m. connectens Stresemann, EFT, 1916 – southern Ryukyu Islands (Amami Ōshima, Okinawa, and Miyako Island, southern Japan)
- C. m. osai Ogawa, M, 1905 – Yaeyama Islands of southern Ryukyu Islands (Ishigaki, Iriomote, Kohama, Kuru, and Aragusuku, southern Japan)
- C. m. mandshuricus Buturlin, SA, 1913 – northeastern Asia
- C. m. colonorum Swinhoe, R, 1864 – central and southern China including Hainan, Taiwan, and northern Indochina. (includes hassi, mengtszensis and hainanus)
- C. m. tibetosinensis Kleinschmidt, O & Weigold, MH, 1922 – eastern Himalayas to southeastern Tibet, northern Myanmar, and western China
- C. m. intermedius Adams, AL, 1859 – far eastern Iran to northwestern India and western Himalayas
- C. m. macrorhynchos Wagler, JG, 1827 – southern Indochina, the Malay Peninsula, Sumatra, Java, and the Lesser Sunda Islands. (includes timoriensis)
- C. m. levaillantii Lesson, RP, 1831 – northeastern India (west to West Bengal) and eastern Nepal eastward to western Thailand, and Andaman Islands. (includes andamanensis)
- C. m. culminatus Sykes, WH, 1832 – peninsular India and Sri Lanka. (includes anthracinus)

Two of the above subspecies have sometimes been treated as separate species: C. m. levaillantii as the eastern jungle crow and C. m. culminatus as the Indian jungle crow. The Philippine jungle crow (Corvus philippinus) was formerly also considered to be a subspecies but is now treated as a distinct species based on a phylogenetic study published in 2012 that compared mitochondrial DNA sequences.

== Description ==
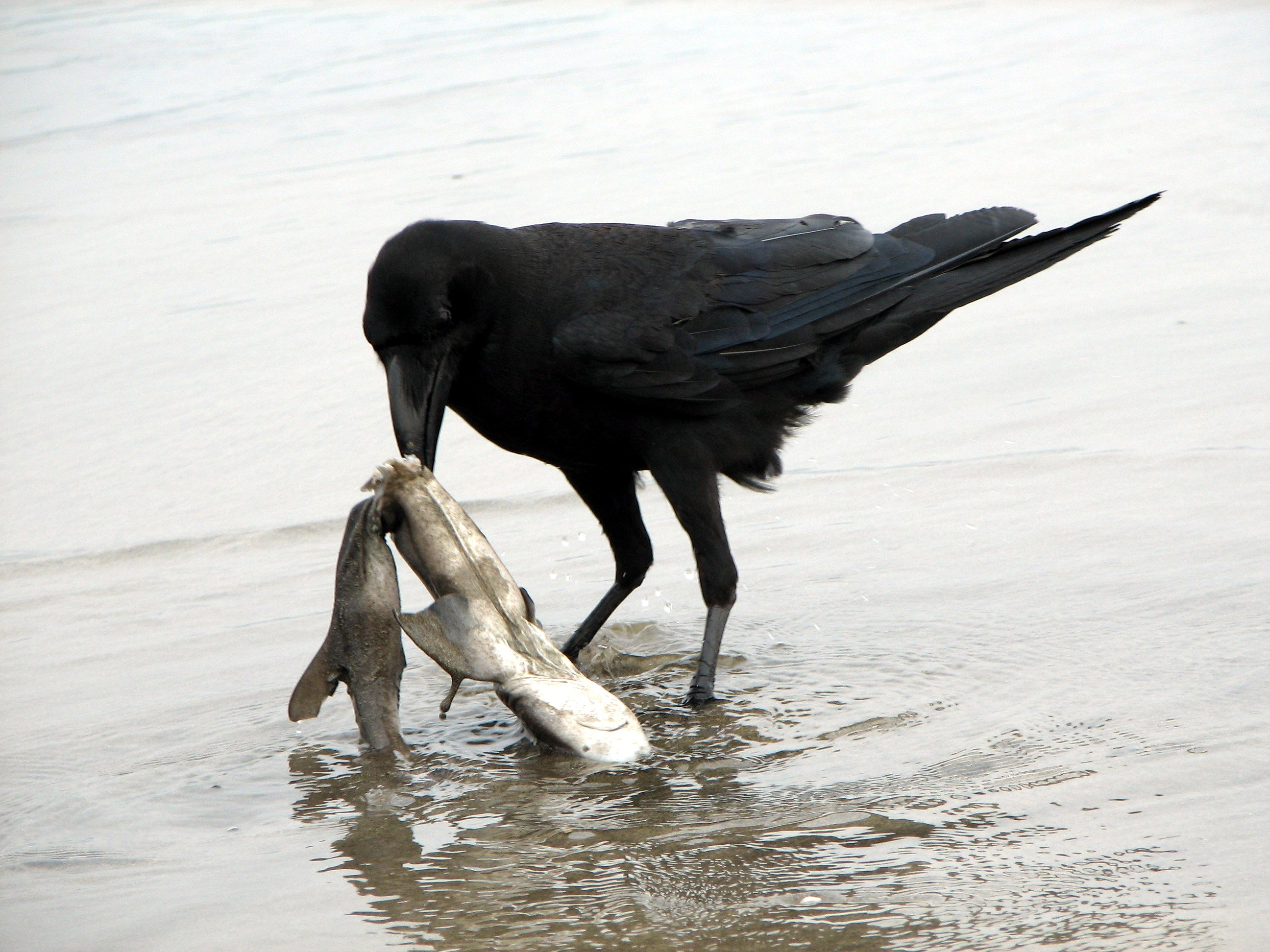
Ssp. japonensis scavenging on a dead shark

The large-billed crow is relatively large all-black corvid. It is 46–59 cm (18–23 in) in length and 450–1,000 g (16–35 oz) in weight. It has a large black bill with an arched culmen. The base of the culmen is hidden by a layer of overlapping black rictal bristles. The glossy black plumage has a purple sheen. The bases of the neck feathers are pale grey. The throat has elongated hackle feathers. The irises are dark brown and the legs are black. The sexes are similar in plumage but the female, on average, is smaller than the male and has a less arched culmen. The juvenile has less glossy plumage and has smoky blue rather than brown irises. The subspecies differ in overall size, the bill size and the degree of gloss on the plumage. The largest subspecies is C. m. japonensis which has a bill measuring 70–80 mm (2.8–3.1 in) in length. The smallest subspecies is C. m. culminatus with a bill measuring 52–67 mm (2.0–2.6 in). The calls are complex and difficult to compare but in Nepal, the smaller C. m. culminatus has a higher pitched voice than the larger C. m. intermedius.

== Distribution and habitat ==
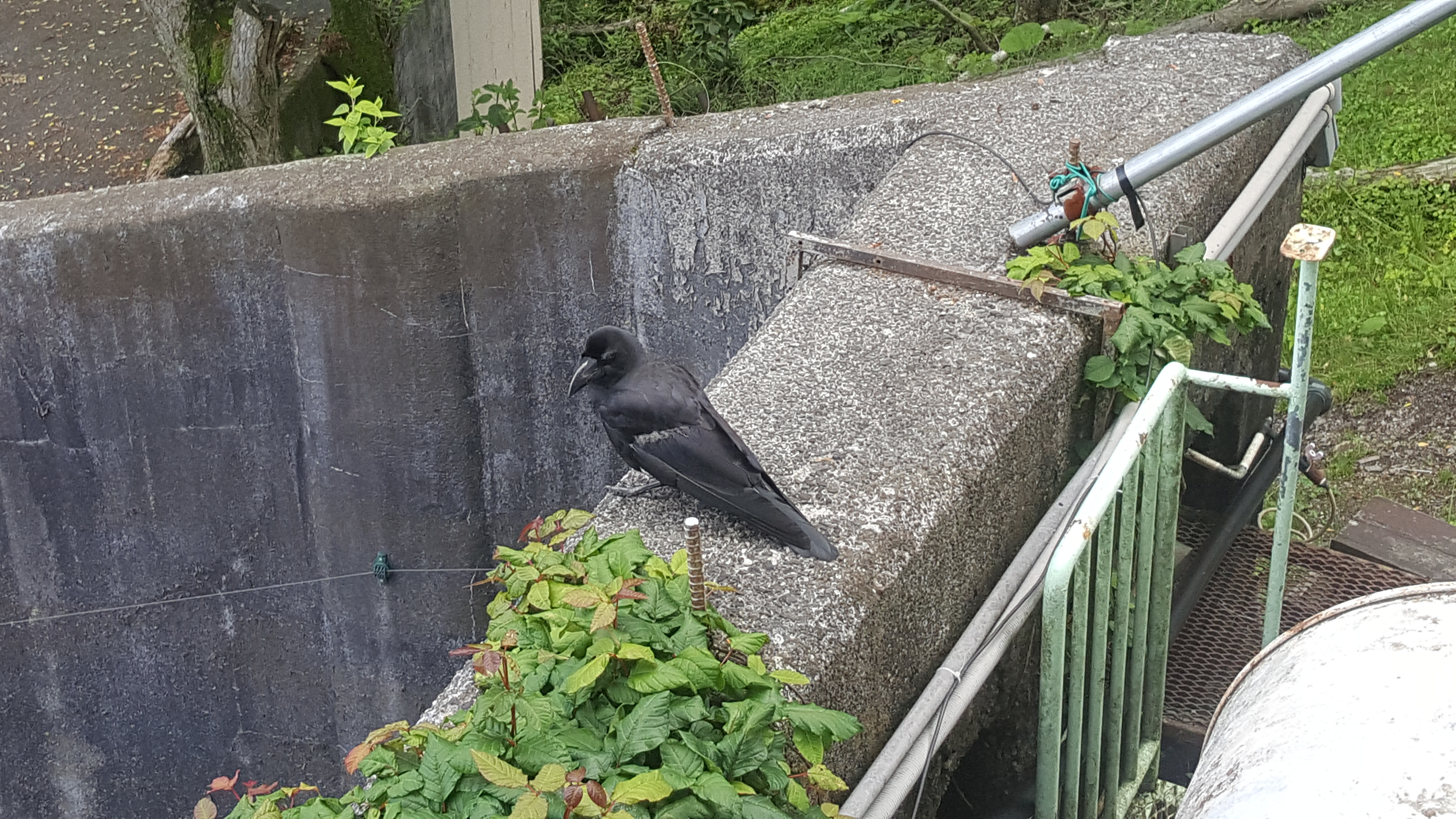
A large-billed crow at Hokkaido, Japan

Large billed crows perching on a Bosai Musen

The range of this species is extensive and stretches from the northeastern Asian seaboard to Afghanistan and eastern Iran in the west, through South to India and Sri Lanka and Southeast Asia, to the Lesser Sundas and Cambodia in the southeast. It occurs in woodland, parks and gardens, cultivated regions with at least some trees, but is a bird of more open country in the south of its range where it is not in competition with the common raven and carrion crow of the North.

== Ecology and behaviour ==
=== Diet ===
Extremely versatile in its feeding, it will take food from the ground or in trees. They feed on a wide range of items and will attempt to feed on anything appearing edible, alive or dead, plant or animal. It is also one of the most persistent species and is quite bold, especially in urban areas. In Japan, crows are considered to be a pest, as they rip open garbage bags and take wire coat hangers for their nests. The Japanese subspecies of Large-billed crow are also known for their regular, unprovoked attacks on humans, especially when passing through near their nesting areas. In Sri Lanka, the jungle crow might is an important predator of local small animals; jungle crows are highly experienced at catching lizards, taking only 45 minutes to find, catch and consume four critically endangered endemic lizards in Horton Plains National Park.

Hoarding behaviour has been noted in ssp. culminatus.

=== Breeding ===
Large-billed crow in Japan

The nest is a platform of twigs, usually high up on a tree with a preference for tall conifers like fir or pine. There are normally 3–5 eggs laid and they are incubated for 17–19 days. The young are fledged usually by about the 35th day. In India, the large-billed crow breed from March to May, but in the plains some of them start even in mid December. The nest is built in a fork of a tree, and is a shallow cup of sticks, sometimes neat and well made, sometimes sketchy and ragged; it is lined with grass roots, wool, rags, vegetable fibre, and similar materials.

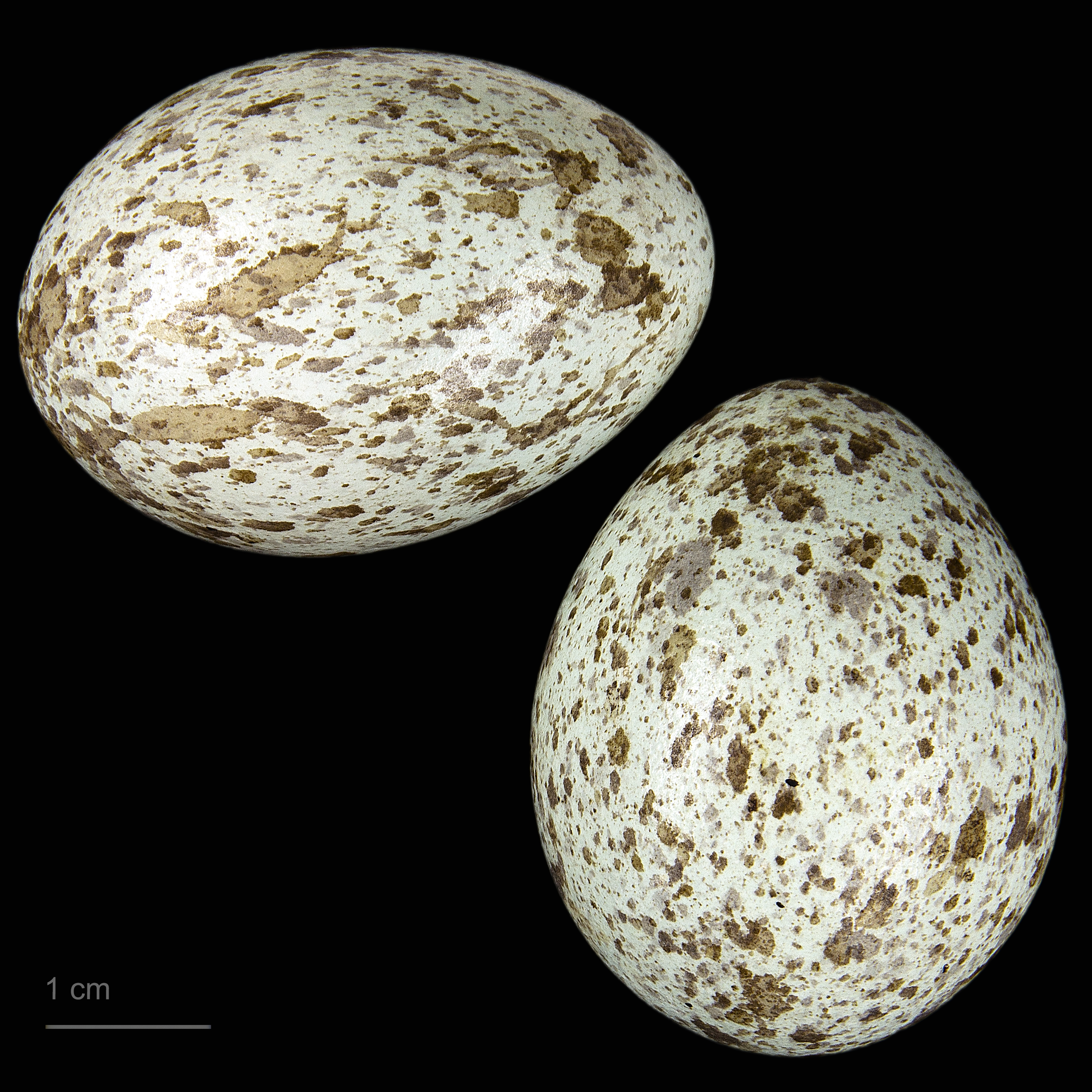
Eggs, Muséum de Toulouse

The normal clutch consists of four or five eggs, and rarely six or seven. The egg is a broad oval, rather pointed at the smaller end. The texture is hard and fine and there is a fair gloss. The ground colour is any shade of blue-green, and is blotched, speckled and streaked with dull reddish-brown, pale sepia, grey and neutral tint. In size the eggs average about 1.45 by 1.05 inches. The jungle crow can serve as a host for the Asian koel.

=== Roosting ===
Gregarious at roosts with many thousands at some roost sites. Large flocks may be seen at dusk arriving at major roost sites. These roosts show no apparent reduction even during the breeding season, and this is because they do not breed during their first year. During the day pairs may be involved in defending their territory but at night they may roost in large groups. They have linear dominance hierarchies that are remembered based on individual recognition.

== Voice ==
The voice is similar to the house crow to which it is closest, but deeper and usually more resonant and described as the usual loud "caa-haa-caa". However, it makes a range of calls, some which could be described as "cau cau" and others that could be mistaken for a woodpecker drumming.

== Mortality factors ==
There are few predators of this species. Filarial parasites have been reported from this species. Pathogenic viruses such as H5N1 have been noted to cause mortality in Japan. Large scale deaths have also been noted to be caused by Clostridium infection and enteritis.
