= Viktor Dolnik =

- Born: Viktor Rafaelyevich Dolnik; Виктор Рафаэльевич Дольник; 13 January 1938; Sverdlovsk, Russian SFSR, USSR
- Died: 4 November 2013 (aged 75)
- Education: Leningradsky University
- Scientific career
- Fields: Biology, ornithology, ethology
- Workplaces: Zoological Institute Of Russian Academy of Science

Viktor Rafaelyevich Dolnik (Russian: Ви́ктор Рафаэ́льевич До́льник; 13 January 1938 – 4 November 2013) was a Russian ornithologist who administered the Rybachy Biological Station for 22 years (from 1967 until 1989). Haemoproteus dolniki is named after him.

== Biography ==
Dolnik was born in Sverdlovsk in 1938. In 1960, he graduated from Leningrad State University. For thirty years, he was the chief of the ornithological station "Rybachy" (literally "Fishers'" - after the village where it was situated). He gained a Candidate of Science degree in 1967, and the Doctor of Science in 1976. He became a professor in 1983.

Dolnik was chief research fellow at Zoological institute of Russian Academy of science. He was the vice-president of the Russian ornithologists' Union, an honorary member of the American ornithological union, and a corresponding member of German and Dutch ornithological unions. He was a recipient of the Medal "For Distinguished Labour" and the Medal "Veteran of Labour".

He died on 4 November 2013.

== Works ==
Dolnik has about two hundred written works. Together with M.A. Kozlov, he was the author of a textbook on zoology for secondary schools. He was best known to the general public for a series of articles concerning human ethology (1980-1990s). These articles later were compiled into a book "Disobedient Child of Biosphere" (1994).
