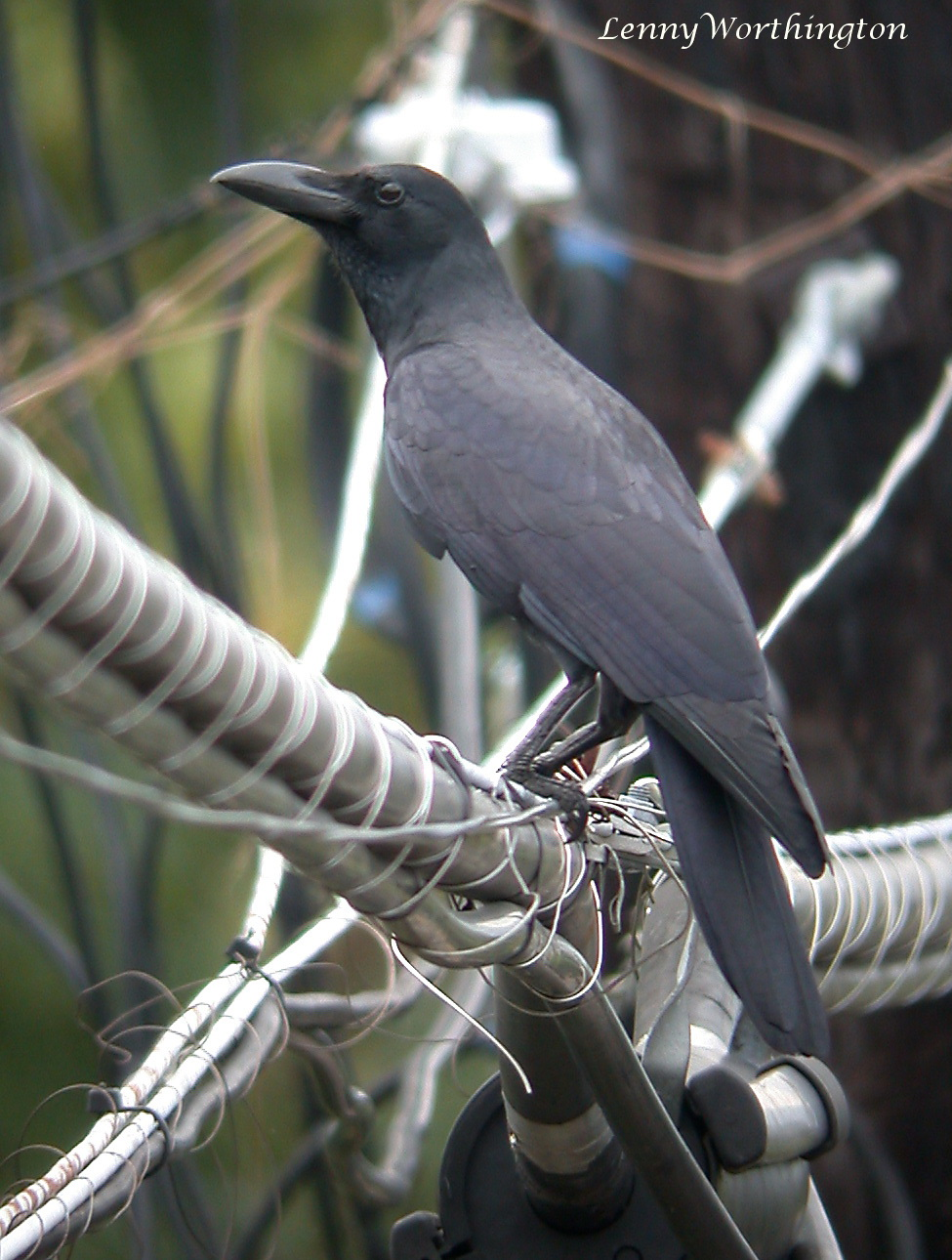

Conservation status
- Not evaluated (IUCN 3.1)

Scientific classification
- Kingdom: Animalia
- Phylum: Chordata
- Class: Aves
- Order: Passeriformes
- Family: Corvidae
- Genus: Corvus
- Species: C. philippinus

Binomial name
- Corvus philippinus Bonaparte, 1853

= Philippine jungle crow =

Species of bird

The Philippine jungle crow (Corvus philippinus) is a species of crow endemic to the Philippines. It is a generalist and found across a wide range of habitats including near human settlements. It was formerly a subspecies of the Large-billed crow but has now been designated as a distinct species.

== Description and taxonomy ==
The Philippine jungle crow was formally described in 1853 by the French naturalist Charles Lucien Bonaparte under the current binomial name Corvus philippinus. It was formerly considered to be a subspecies of the large-billed crow (Corvus macrorhynchos) but is now separated as a distinct species based on the vocal and genetic differences. It also differs as it has a whiter base on its neck feathers and has a longer tail. The species is monotypic: no subspecies are recognised.

== Ecology and behavior ==
This species is a generalist. It feeds on carrion, small vertebrares, insects, young birds, fruit and even feeds on leftovers near human dwellings. This species is typically encountered in pairs or in small groups.

This species has been recorded laying eggs from March to August. Nest is described as a platform of twigs placed high above the ground on a tree-fork. Clutch size is typically 3 dull green eggs with brown and gray spots.

== Habitat and conservation status ==
This species is a generalist. It can be seen in forest, woodlands, forest edge, clearings, farms, plantations, beaches and near human habitation.

This is a newly split species and has yet to be assessed by the International Union for Conservation of Nature. This bird is believed to be common through its wide range of habitats.
