= Jungle crow =

Jungle crow is a common name that refers to three species of crow. Initially thought to be a single species, the group has since been split into the following species:

- Large-billed crow, Corvus macrorhynchos
- Eastern jungle crow, Corvus levaillantii
- Indian jungle crow, Corvus culminatus
