= Medal "For Distinguished Labour" =

Soviet civilian labor award

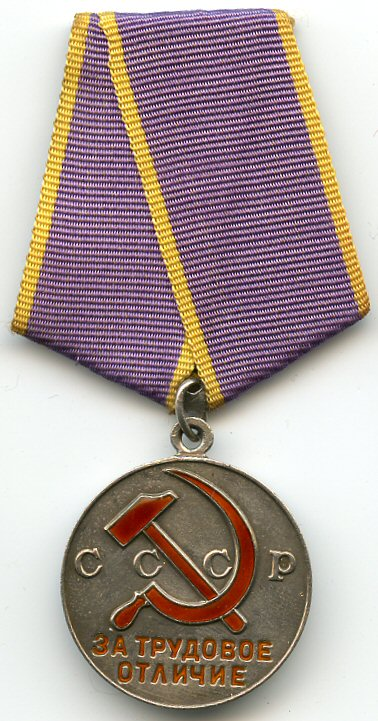
- Medal "For Distinguished Labour" (obverse)
- Type: Civilian efficiency medal
- Country: Soviet Union
- Presented by: USSR
- Eligibility: Soviet citizens and foreign nationals
- Established: 27 December 1938
- First award: 15 January 1939

Highlights
- Total: 2,146,400
- Ribbon of the Medal "For Distinguished Labour"

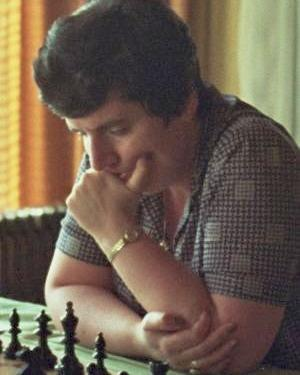
Chess Grandmaster Nona Gaprindashvili, a recipient of the Medal "For Distinguished Labour"

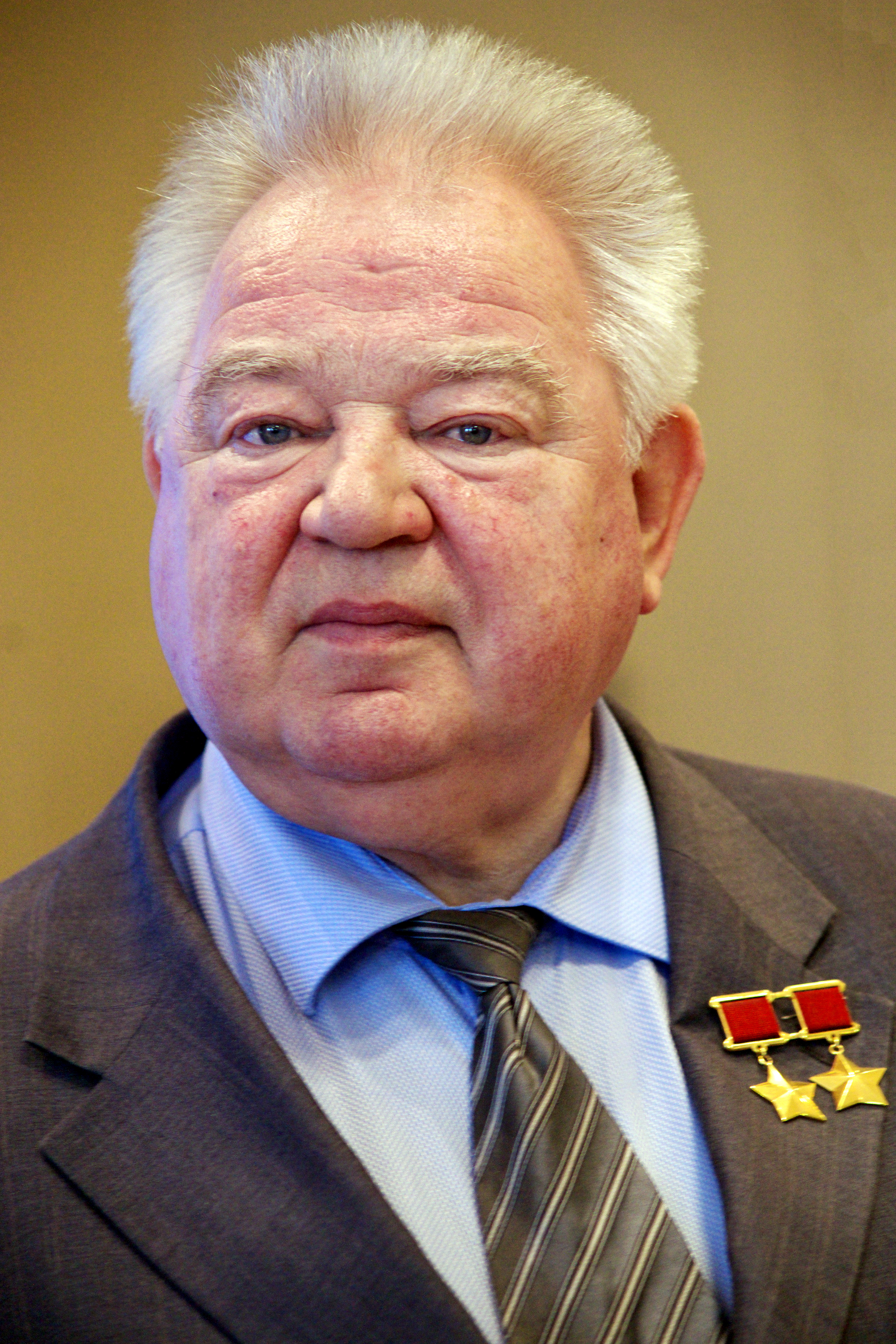
Cosmonaut Georgy Grechko, a recipient of the Medal "For Distinguished Labour"

The Medal "For Distinguished Labour" (Russian: Медаль «За трудовое отличие») was a civilian labour award of the Soviet Union bestowed to especially deserving workers to recognise and honour high performances in labour or contributions in the fields of science, culture or the manufacturing industry. In just over fifty years of existence, it was bestowed to over two million deserving citizens. It was established on 27 December 1938 by decree of the Presidium of the Supreme Soviet of the USSR. Its statute was amended three times by further decrees, firstly on 19 June 1943 to amend its description and ribbon, then on 16 December 1947 to amend its regulations, and finally on 18 July 1980 to confirm all previous amendments. The medal ceased to be awarded following the December 1991 dissolution of the Soviet Union.

== Medal statute ==
The Medal "For Distinguished Labour" was awarded to workers, farmers, specialists of the national economy, workers of science, culture, education, health and to other to citizens of the USSR, and in exceptional cases, to foreign nationals, for:

- an impact on work conducive to the growth of labour productivity and improvement in product quality, for achievements in the socialist competition;
- contribution to the construction or reconstruction of major economic projects;
- valuable innovations and rationalization proposals;
- successful work in the field of science, culture, literature, the arts, education, health, trade, catering, housing, utilities, public services, or in other areas of employment;
- active work in the Community education and training of young people, for success in public and social activities;
- achievements in the field of physical culture and sports.

The Medal "For Distinguished Labour" was worn on the left side of the chest and in the presence of other medals of the USSR, immediately after the Medal "For Labour Valour". If worn in the presence of awards of the Russian federation, the latter have precedence.

In addition to its place within the order of wear, the medal was often presented during official ceremonies marking professional holidays, production milestones, or significant anniversaries in Soviet industry in World War II. Recipients typically received an accompanying certificate issued by the Presidium of the Supreme Soviet of the Soviet Union, which formally recorded the grounds for the award. Although primarily civilian in character, the medal was regarded as one of the more widely awarded distinctions of the Soviet honours system, reflecting the state’s emphasis on labour achievements, civic participation, and contributions to the national economy.

== Medal description ==
The Medal "For Distinguished Labour" was a 32 mm in diameter circular medal struck from .925 silver with a raised rim on both sides. In the upper 3/4 of the obverse, a 21 mm high by 20 mm wide ruby-red enamelled image of the hammer and sickle over the relief inscription "USSR" (Russian: «СССР») in 3.5 mm high letters. In the lower quarter of the obverse below the hammer and sickle, the sunken and red enamelled inscription on two rows "FOR DISTINGUISHED LABOUR" (Russian: «ЗА ТРУДОВОЕ ОТЛИЧИЕ») in 2 mm high letters. On the otherwise plain reverse, the relief inscription on two rows of 2.5 mm high letters "LABOUR IN THE USSR - A MATTER OF HONOUR" (Russian: «ТРУД В СССР — ДЕЛО ЧЕСТИ»). The medal was numbered until 1945.

Early awards hung from a small triangular mount covered with a red ribbon with a threaded stub and screw for attachment to clothing. Following the 1943 decree, the Medal "For Labour Valour" was secured by a ring through the medal suspension loop to a standard Soviet pentagonal mount covered by a 24mm wide lilac coloured silk moiré ribbon with 2 mm wide yellow edge stripes.

| 1938 - 1943 | 1938 - 1943 | 1943 - 1991 | 1943 - 1991 |
| Obverse | Reverse | Obverse | Reverse |

== Recipients (partial list) ==
The first investiture took place on 15 January 1939, when the Medal "For Distinguished Labour" was presented to 19 employees of the Kalinin armaments plant number 8 for exceptional service to the country in the creation and development of new weapons for the Workers' and Peasants' Red Army.

The individuals below were all recipients of the Medal "For Distinguished Labour".

- Composer, Hero of Socialist Labour, People's Artist of the USSR, Major General Boris Alexandrovich Alexandrov
- Football goalkeeper and Olympic medalist Vladimir Aleksandrovich Astapovsky
- Olympic basketball medalist Sergei Alexandrovich Belov
- Minister of Civil Aviation of the USSR, Hero of Socialist Labour, Chief Marshal of Aviation Boris Pavlovich Bugaev
- Women's World Chess Champion, first female Grandmaster, Nona Terent'evna Gaprindashvili
- Twice Hero of the Soviet Union cosmonaut Georgy Mikhaylovich Grechko
- Chief research fellow at the Zoological Institute of the Russian Science Academy Viktor Rafaelyevich Dolnik
- Ice dancer and coach Natalia Ilinichna Dubova
- Composer Aleksander Sergeyevich Zatsepin
- Mathematician and academician Alexey Grigorevich Ivakhnenko
- Ice hockey defenceman, Olympic medalist Alexei Viktorovich Kasatonov
- Composer, actor, and operatic tenor singer Abdylas Maldybaev
- Former ice hockey player and coach Viktor Vasilyevich Tikhonov
- Archaeologist and historian Svetlana Alexandrovna Pletneva
- Physicist and mathematician Sergey Pavlovich Kurdyumov
- Swimmer, Olympic medalist Yelena Kruglova
- Honoured Master of Sport Alexander Borisovich Kozhukhov
- Composer, People's Artist of the USSR Lyudmila Lyadova
- Playwright Kasymaly Jantöshev

== See also ==
- Orders, decorations, and medals of the Soviet Union
