= Rybachy, Kaliningrad Oblast =

Rybachy Рыба́чий
- Rural locality
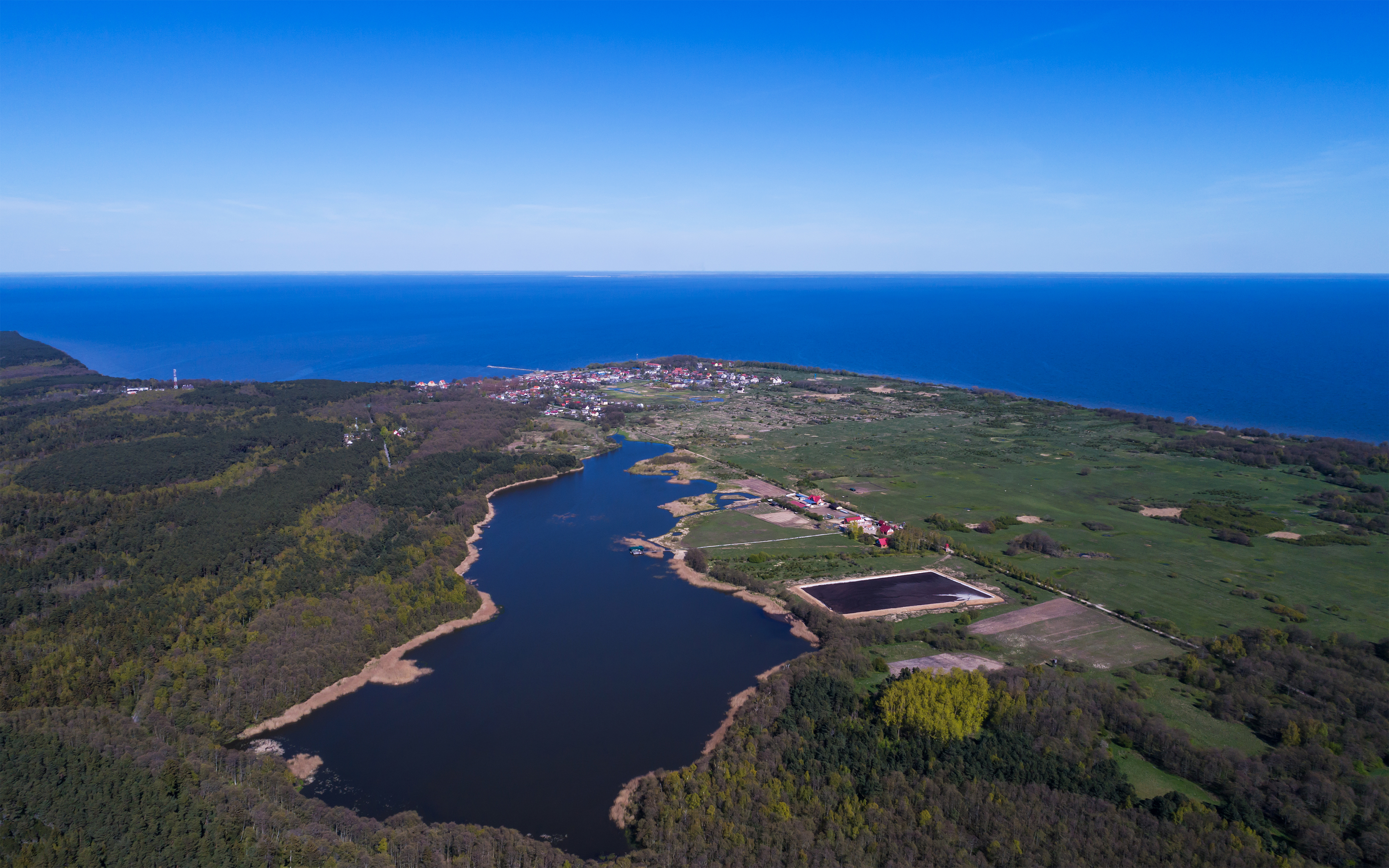
- Lake Chaika and Rybachy, aerial view
- Interactive map of Rybachy
- Location of Rybachy Rybachy (European Russia) Rybachy (Russia)
- Coordinates: 55°09′16″N 20°51′10″E
- Country: Russia
- Federal subject: Kaliningrad Oblast
- Administrative district: Zelenogradsky District
- First mentioned: 1372

Population (2010 Census)
  - Total: 839
  - Estimate (2010): 839 (0%)
- Time zone: UTC+2 (MSK–1)
- Postal code: 238535
- OKTMO ID: 27710000561

Rybachy (Russian: Рыба́чий, from Рыба́к, "Fisherman", German: Rossitten, Lithuanian: Rasytė) is a rural settlement in Zelenogradsky District of Kaliningrad Oblast, Russia, located on the Curonian Spit. As of 2010 it has about 839 residents. It was formerly known for the Rossitten Bird Observatory and the Rossitten gliding school.

== Geography ==
Rybachy is the largest settlement on the Russian side of the Curonian Spit between the Curonian Lagoon and the Baltic Sea, close to the border with Lithuania. It is the administrative seat of the Kurschskaja Kossa (Curonian Spit) municipality. It lies approximately 35 kilometres (22 mi) north-east of Zelenogradsk.

== History ==
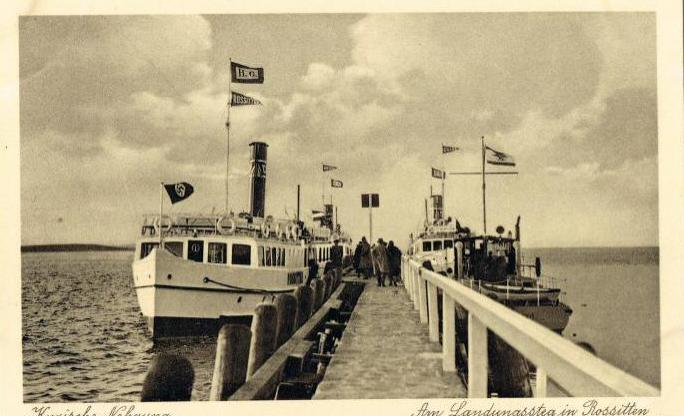
Rossitten pier, 1930s/40s

A Teutonic Ordensburg castle on the road from Königsberg to Memel (Klaipėda) was first mentioned in 1372. It had been the site of a Curonian fishing village, named after Old Prussian rosit ("dew", cf. Lithuanian: Rasa). Constantly threatened by coastal dunes the settlement had to be relocated several times until their migration was stopped by large-scale afforestation in the 19th century.

In 1454, the Curonian Spit was incorporated by King Casimir IV Jagiellon to the Kingdom of Poland upon the request of the Prussian Confederation. After the subsequent Thirteen Years' War, since 1466, it formed part of Poland as a fief held by the Teutonic Order, and from 1525, it was held by the Duchy of Prussia. From 1701, on it was part of the Kingdom of Prussia, and since 1871, it belonged to Germany, within which it was administratively located in the province of East Prussia until the end of World War II. In the late 19th century, the village had a population of 369, mostly employed in fishing, but also in agriculture. In the 1920s, the dunes near the village with their updraft was a popular venue for glider pilots like Julius Hatry. In 1924, the local gliding school became part of the Rhön-Rossitten Gesellschaft, predecessor of the Deutsche Forschungsanstalt für Segelflug (German Research Institute for Sailplane Flight). The area was also known as an elk habitat. In the 1930s, it developed to a resort town.

It was transferred, along with the northern portion of the former province of East Prussia, to the Soviet Union in the aftermath of World War II. Rybachy translates as "Fishers' (settlement)", and appropriately employment centers on the fishing boats which dock at the pier on the Curonian Lagoon. The former Rossitten Bird Observatory (1901-1944) is today the site of the Rybachy Biological Station, founded in 1956 by Lev Belopolsky, which continues research on bird migration.

In 2006, Rybachy's classification was downgraded from an urban-type settlement to a rural settlement.

== Politics ==
=== Sister cities ===
- Brachttal, Germany – since March 2015

== Sights ==
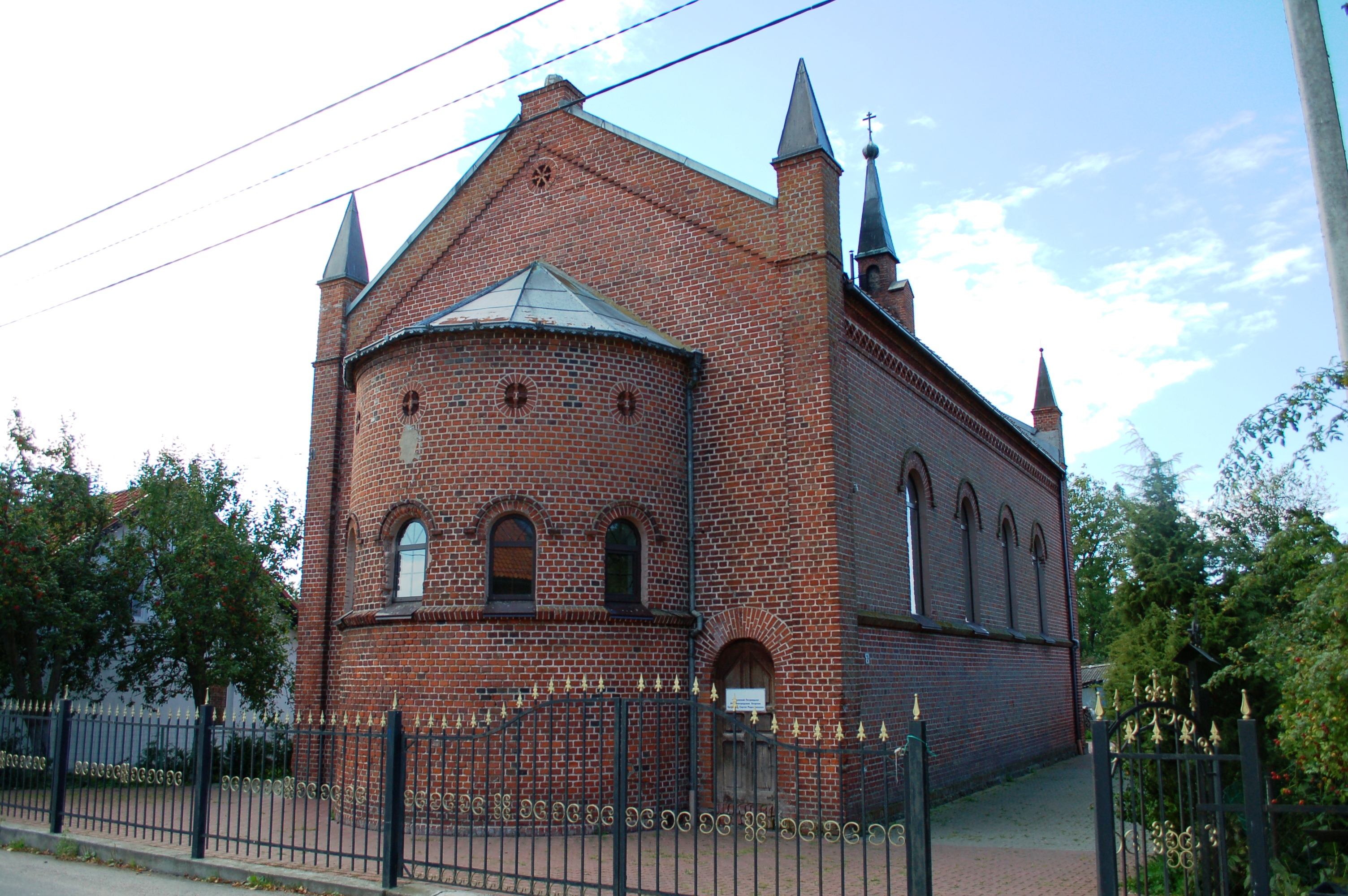
St. Sergius Church

=== Church ===
The red brick former Lutheran church was built in 1873 when the village was part of Germany. It is one of the oldest remaining buildings in Rybachy. After the Second World War it was used for wheat storage. Only in 1992 was the church handed to the Russian Orthodox Church to be renovated. It is named after St Sergius of Radonezh and is in use once more as a church, now catering to the Orthodox community. In front of the church is a metal cross cast in 1992 by Eduardas Jonusas, an artist from the neighbouring Lithuanian town of Nida. This cross was erected in memory of the former German citizens of Rossitten.

=== Old cemetery ===
Amidst the forest about 500 m south of the village you can find the old cemetery which has existed since the Middle Ages. The Second World War left it heavily damaged and it was not properly looked after for a long time.

Some restoration work has been carried and it is possible to visit the newly restored gravestones of two famous locals: Johannes Thienemann (1863-1938), the German ornithologist who founded the Rossitten Bird Observatory; and Franz Epha, the legendary dune inspector who was able to stop the huge sand dunes from moving by stabilising them with plants. His pioneering work saved many villages from being buried under the shifting sands.
