= Rossitten Bird Observatory =

First bird observatory in the world

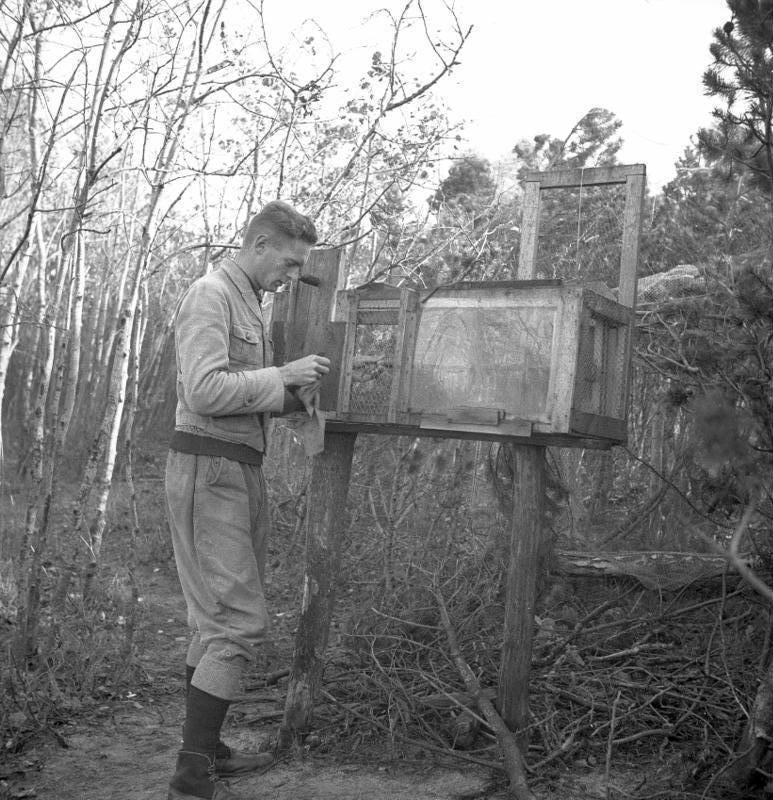
An ornithologist catching and ringing at Rossitten in 1939

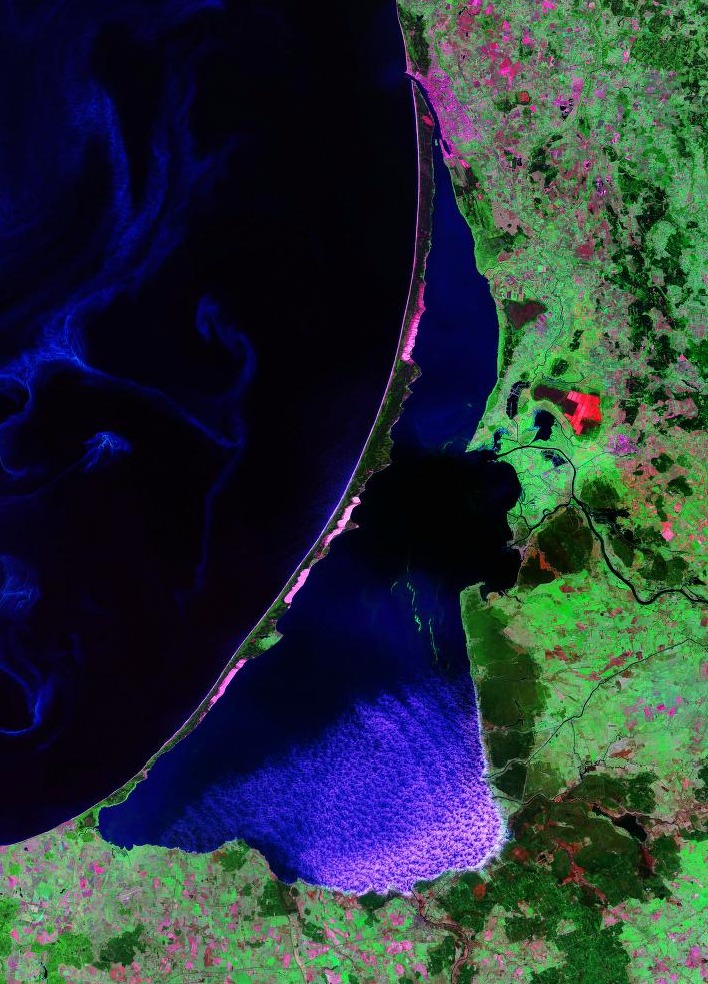
Landsat image of the Curonian Spit and Curonian Lagoon

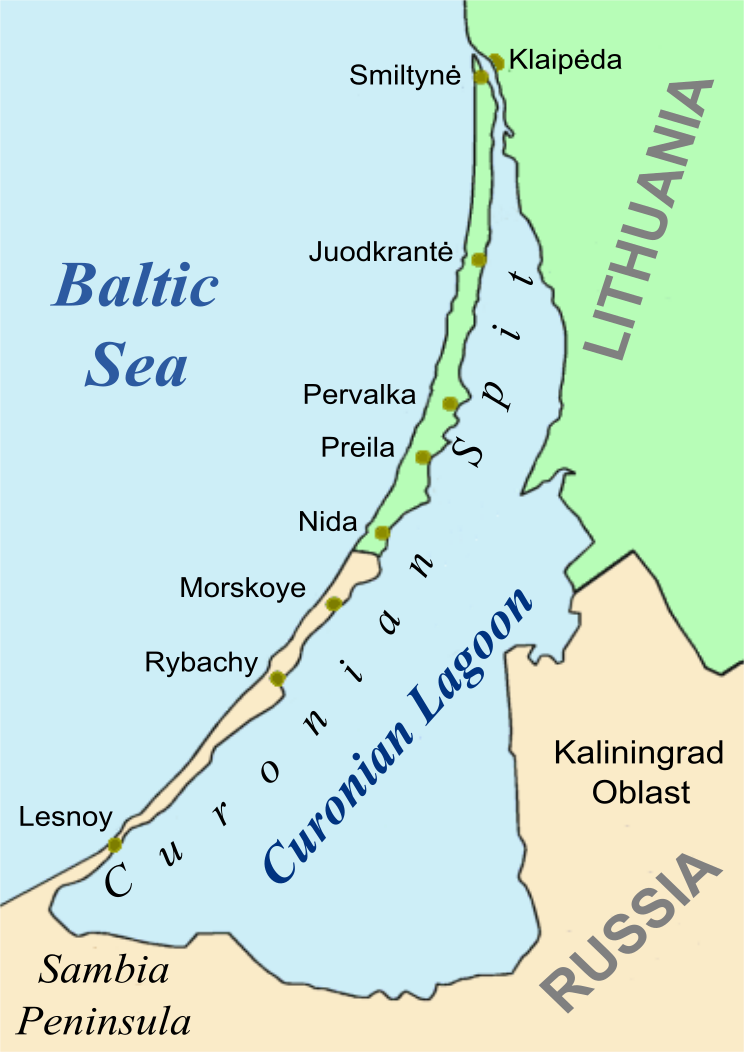
Map showing position of Rybachy (Rossitten)

The Rossitten Bird Observatory (Vogelwarte Rossitten in German) was the world's first dedicated permanent research institution organized specifically as an ornithological observatory. It was sited at Rossitten, East Prussia (now Rybachy, Kaliningrad Oblast, Russia), on the Curonian Spit on the south-eastern coast of the Baltic Sea. It was established by German ornithologist Johannes Thienemann and operated until 1944. In 1945 East Prussia was divided between Poland, Russia and Lithuania, and most ethnic Germans were expelled.

== History ==
The 98 km long Curonian Spit is a thin sand peninsula, ranging from about 400 m to 4 km in width, that separates the Baltic Sea from the shallow Curonian Lagoon. It has several settlements along its length. It lies on a major migration route for birds following the coastline of the eastern Baltic. The richness of birdlife was first noticed by Friedrich Lindner who was a close friend of Johannes Thienemann. Thienemann first visited the fishing village of Rossitten there in 1896 where he experienced “a bird migration proceeding in a regular manner but more massive than had ever before been observed in Germany” and he “could not stop wondering whether something of permanent value might somehow be achieved here”.

At the German Ornithological Society's 50th anniversary celebration in Leipzig in 1900 he gave a lecture that persuaded the Society to establish a bird observatory at Rossitten, as a cooperative project with the Prussian Government. Thienemann was given the job of setting it up, something accomplished when it opened on New Year's Day 1901, as well as serving as the founding director.

The observatory operated under the auspices of the German Ornithological Society until 1923. From then until its dissolution in 1946 the observatory came under the management of the Kaiser Wilhelm Society, giving it a solid institutional framework. Its constitution was ambitious and broad, including nine main areas of bird research: migration, behaviour, moult, economic value, protection, the establishment of a bird collection, the procurement of research material for scientific state institutes, the expansion of research relevance to other kinds of animals, and public education.

Heinrich Himmler sought to use storks bred in the Rossiten observatory to distribute German propaganda in 1943, an idea that was rejected successfully by Ernst Schüz.

It was at first a one-man operation with Thienemann attempting to cover all areas of research. As it grew it focussed increasingly on the study of migration through banding, with roughly a million birds being banded during the 45 years of the observatory's existence. Its success stimulated the establishment of similar organisations such as the Hungarian Ornithological Centre in 1908, Heligoland Bird Observatory in 1910, Sempach Bird Observatory in 1924 and Hiddensee Ornithological Centre in 1936. Thienemann's successor as head of the observatory was Ernst Schüz.

== Successors ==
=== Vogelwarte Radolfzell ===
Following Germany's loss of East Prussia at the end of the Second World War, the institutional inheritor of Rossitten's ornithological research program was the establishment by the Max Planck Society (the renamed Kaiser Wilhelm Society) of the “Vogelwarte Radolfzell”, with the staff from the Rossitten observatory, at the town of Radolfzell am Bodensee at the western end of Lake Constance in Baden-Württemberg in southern Germany, under the auspices of the Max Planck Institute for Behavioral Physiology. In 1998 it became the Max Planck Research Centre for Ornithology.

=== Biological Station Rybachy ===
Meanwhile, at Rossiten, now the renamed Russian settlement of Rybachy, the Rybachy Biological Station was founded in 1956, at the instigation of Russian ornithologist Lev Belopolsky, as a branch of the Zoological Institute of the Russian Academy of Sciences in Saint Petersburg. The station was set up following a special decision of the Board of the Academy of Sciences with the aim of studying bird migration, and of reestablishing the research tradition started by German ornithologists, after the ten-year hiatus. Viktor Dolnik was its director for 22 years, from 1967 until 1989.

The station receives support from the Sielmann Foundation and works closely with western partners, including the Vogelwarte Radolfzell with which it operates a joint trapping and banding station.

== Gallery ==
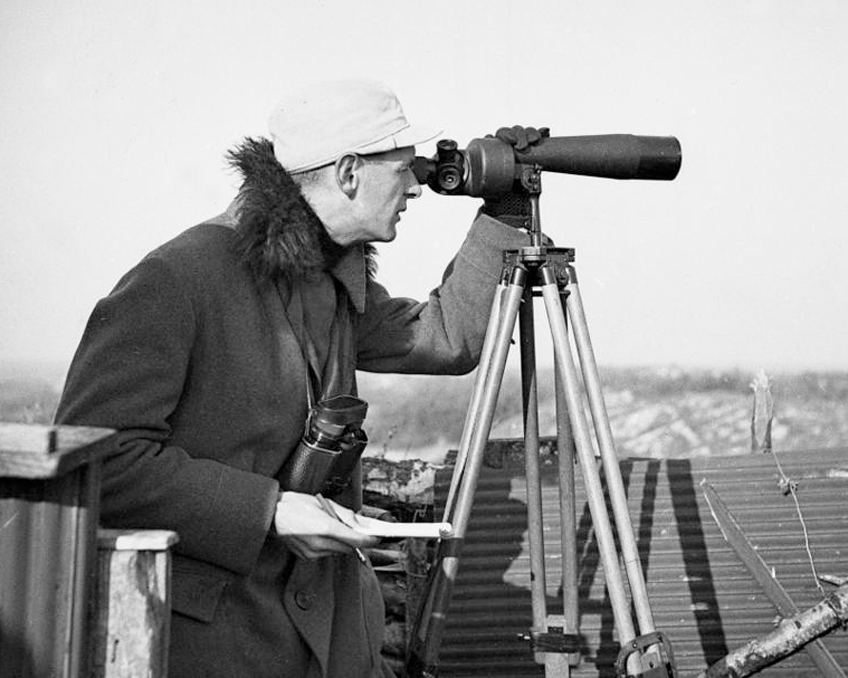
An ornithologist at Rossitten 1910.

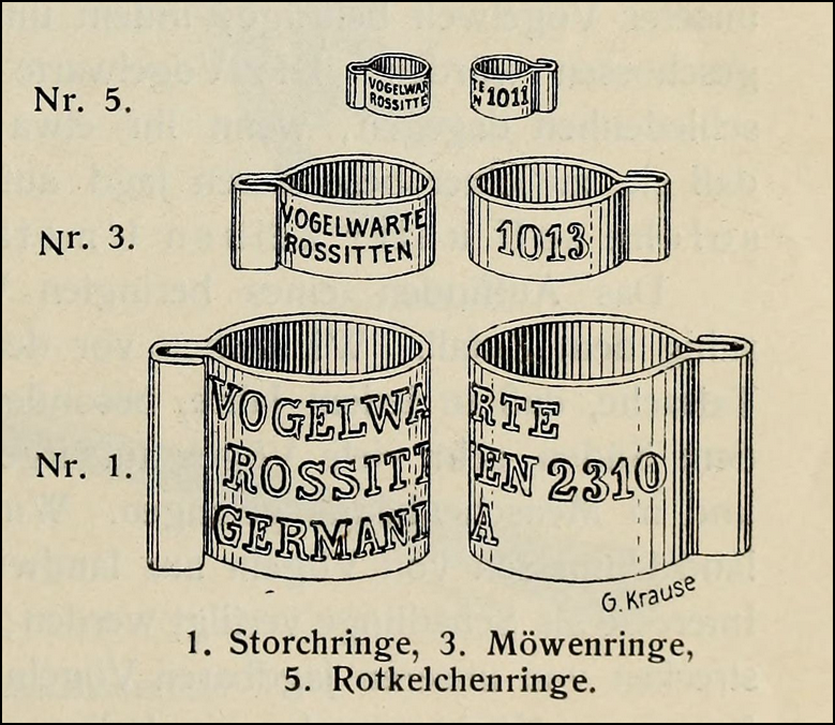
Rings used 1910.

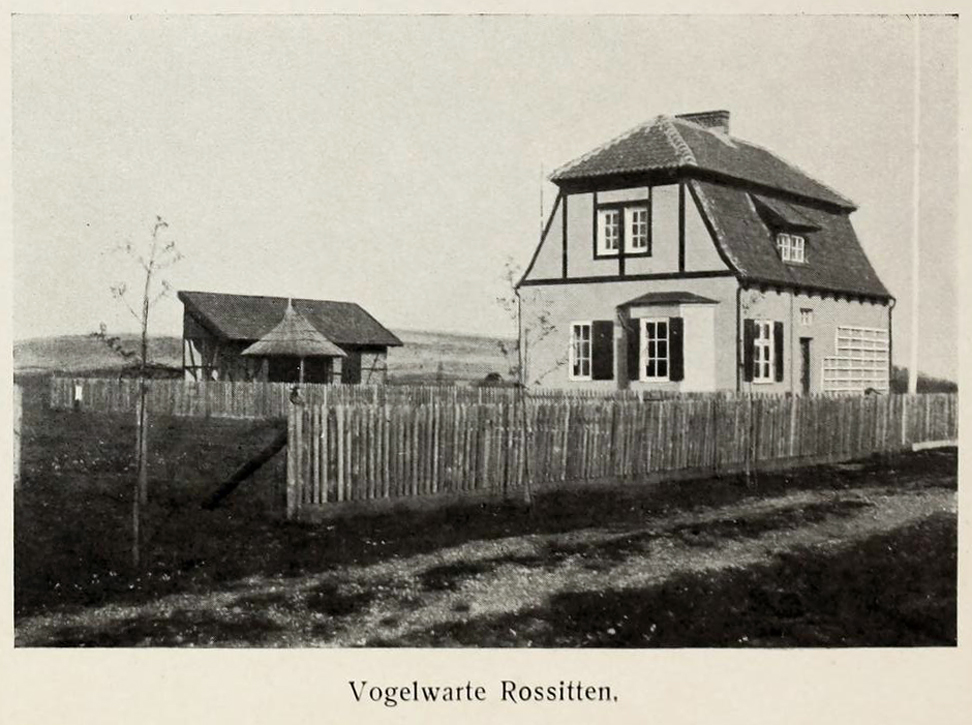
Rossitten Bird Observatory 1910.

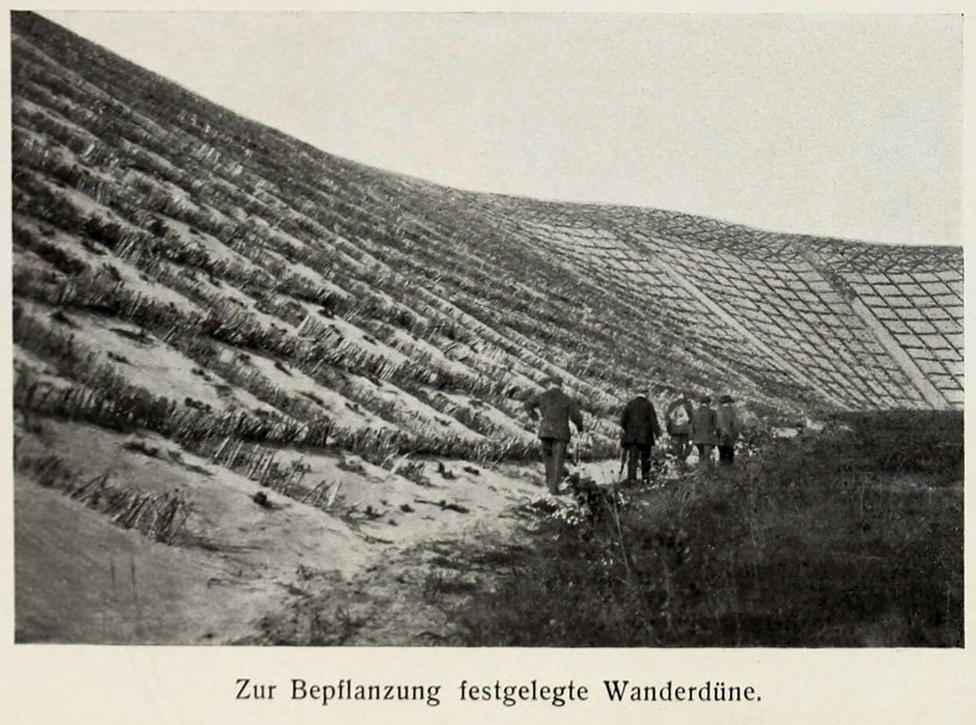
Support plantation of the dunes 1910, in some places the dunes can be over 50 meters high.

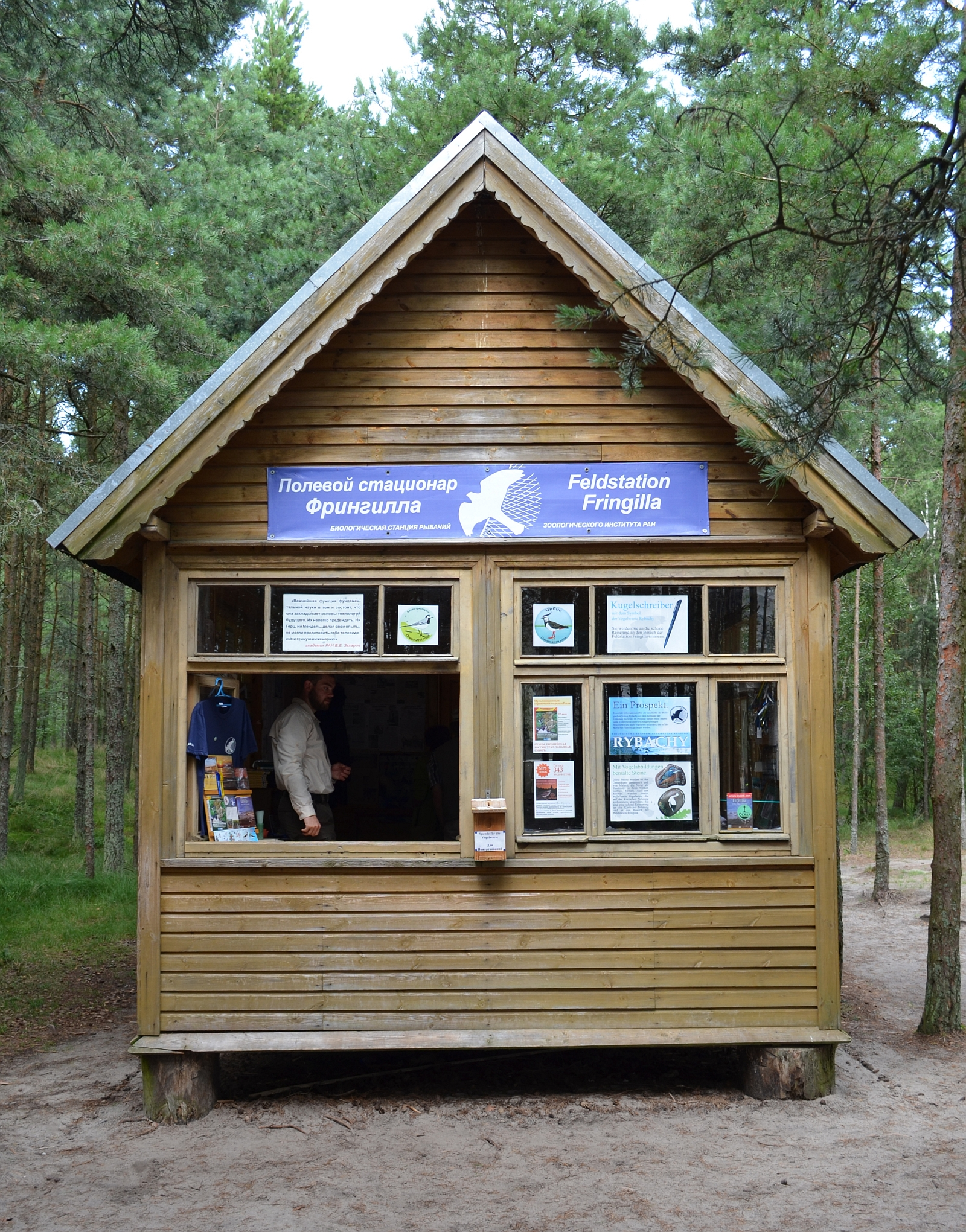
Fringilla station in Rybachy 2011.

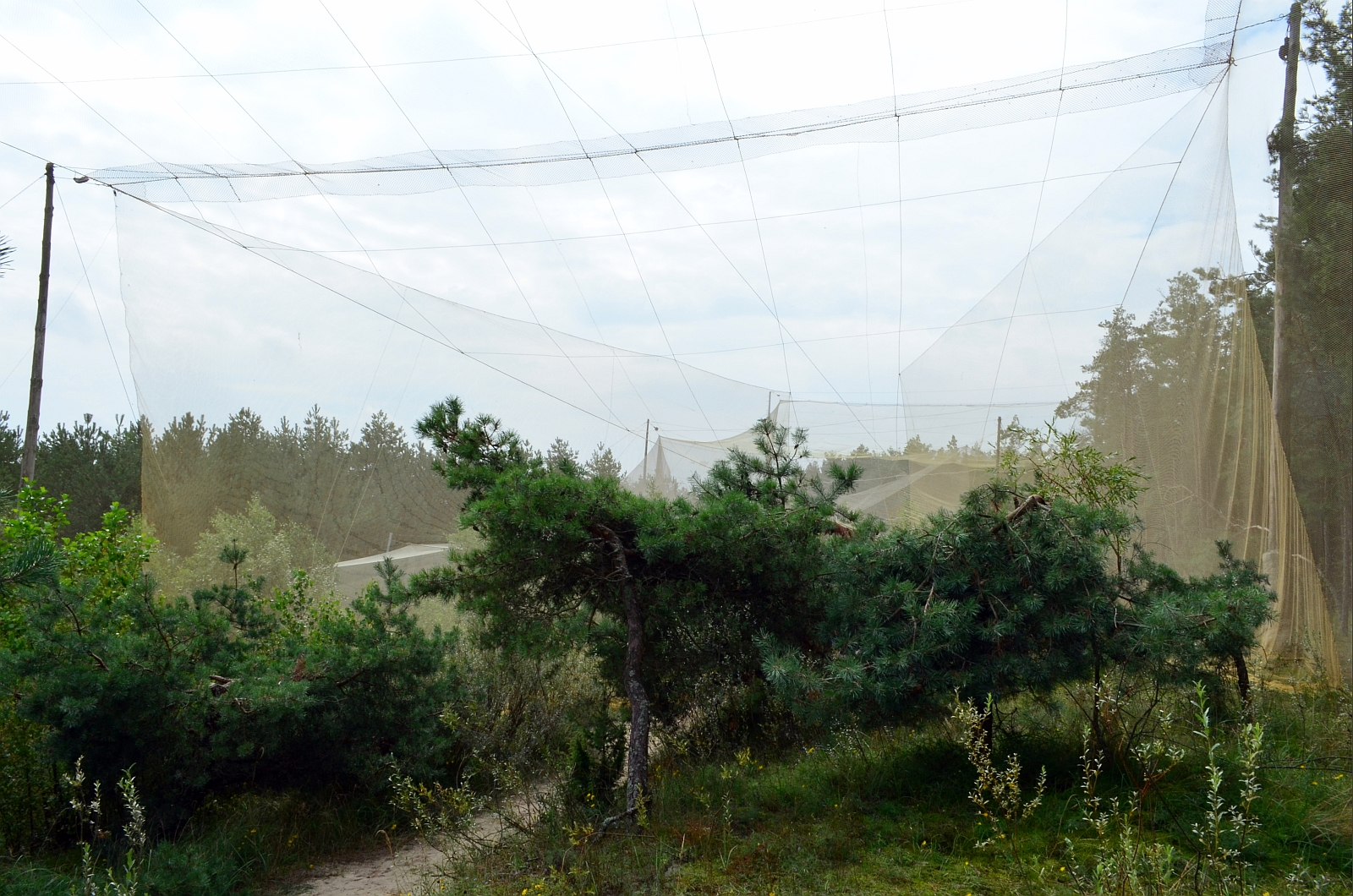
Nets at the Fringilla station in Rybachy 2011.

== See also ==
- Timeline of ornithology
