= Heinrich Gätke =

German ornithologist and artist

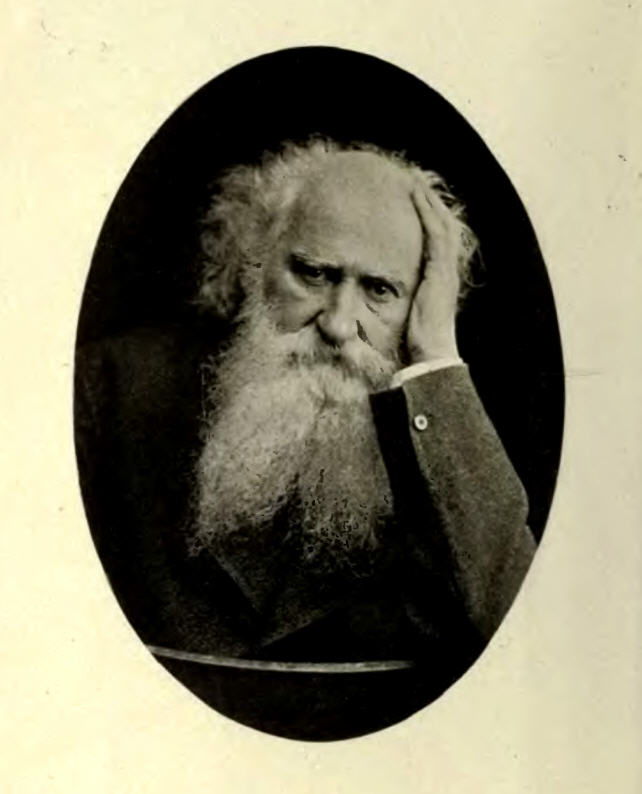
Heinrich Gätke in 1895

Heinrich Gätke (born 19 May or 19 March 1814 in Pritzwalk – died 1 January 1897 in Heligoland) was a German ornithologist and artist.

== Biography ==
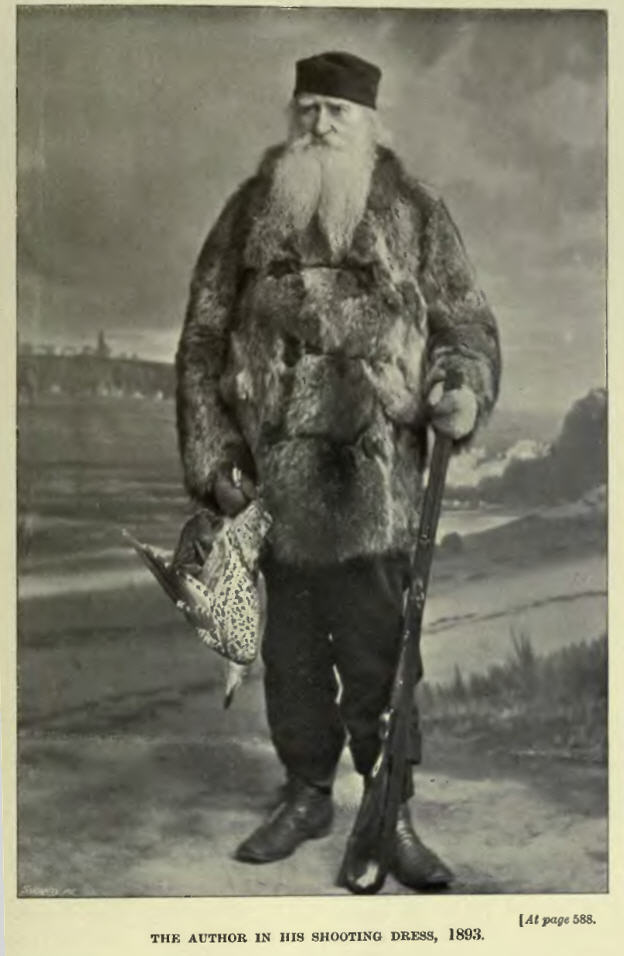

The son of a baker, he was sent to study commerce in Berlin but became a painter. In 1837 he travelled to the island of Heligoland for the first time. From 1841 he decided to live there and from 1843 he studied birds on the island. He studied ornithology and made a collection. In 1891 a station was established in Heligoland and the Prussian government acquired his collection for the North sea museum. The collection was destroyed in 1944 by a bombing.

== Writings ==
- Die Vogelwarte Helgoland, hrsg. von Rudolf Blasius, 1891 (Vogel = bird; Warte = observation point or station)
- Heligoland as an Ornithological Observatory trans. by Rudolph Rosenstock, 1891

== See also ==
- Heligoland Bird Observatory
