= Heligoland Bird Observatory =

Bird Observatory in Germany

Coordinates: 54°11′N 7°53′E

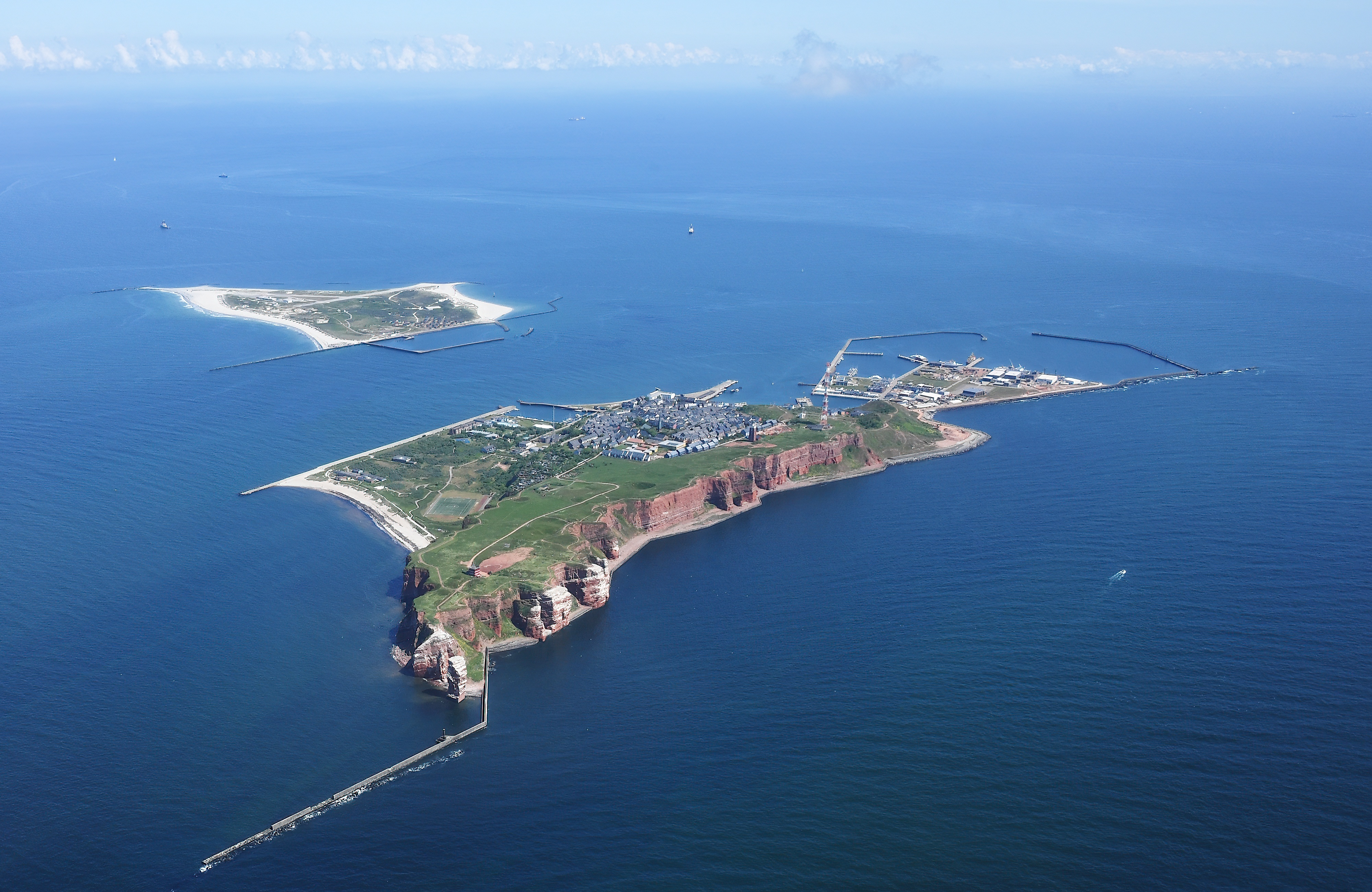
Aerial view of Heligoland with Düne in the background

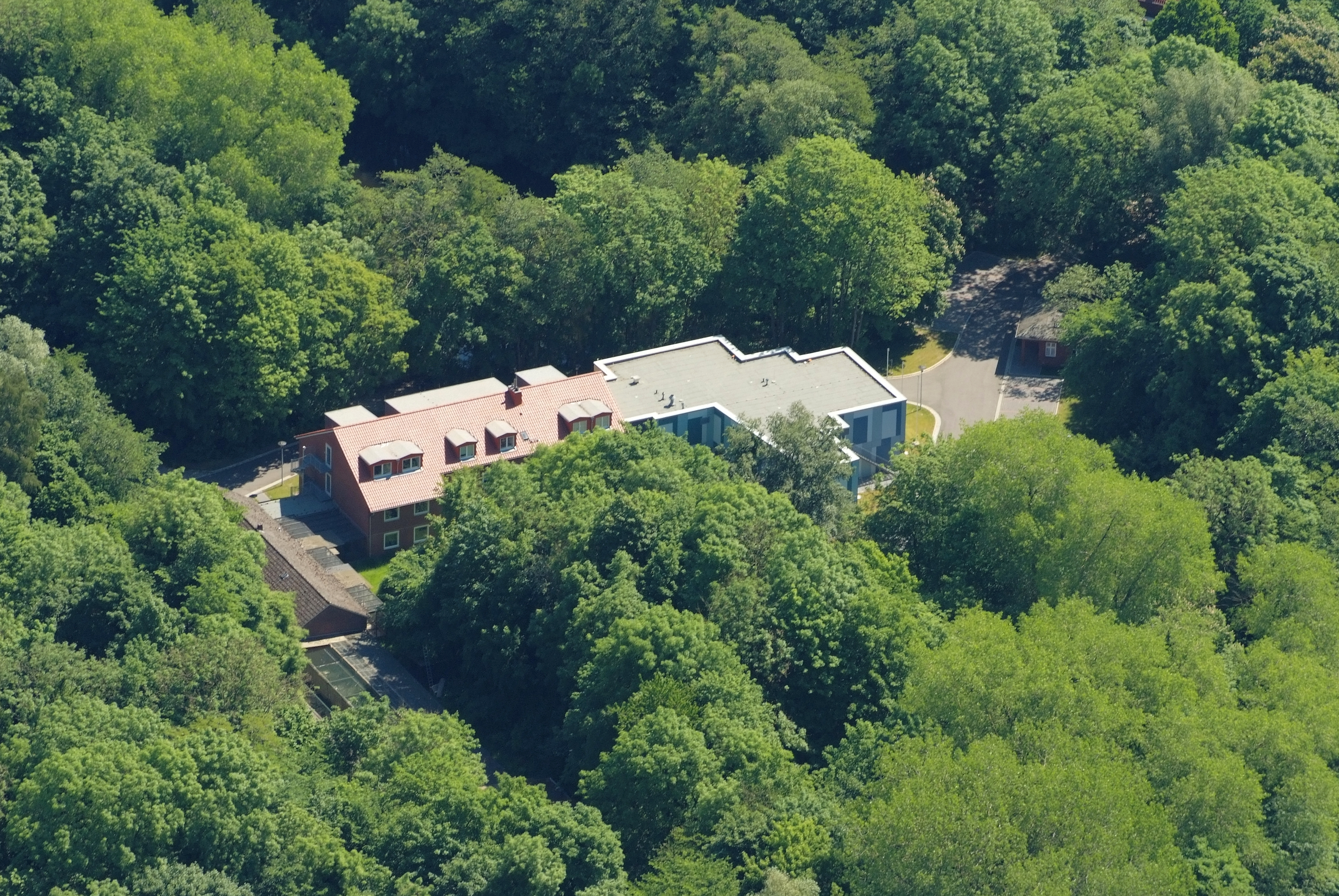
Headquarters of the Heligoland Bird Observatory in Rüstersiel

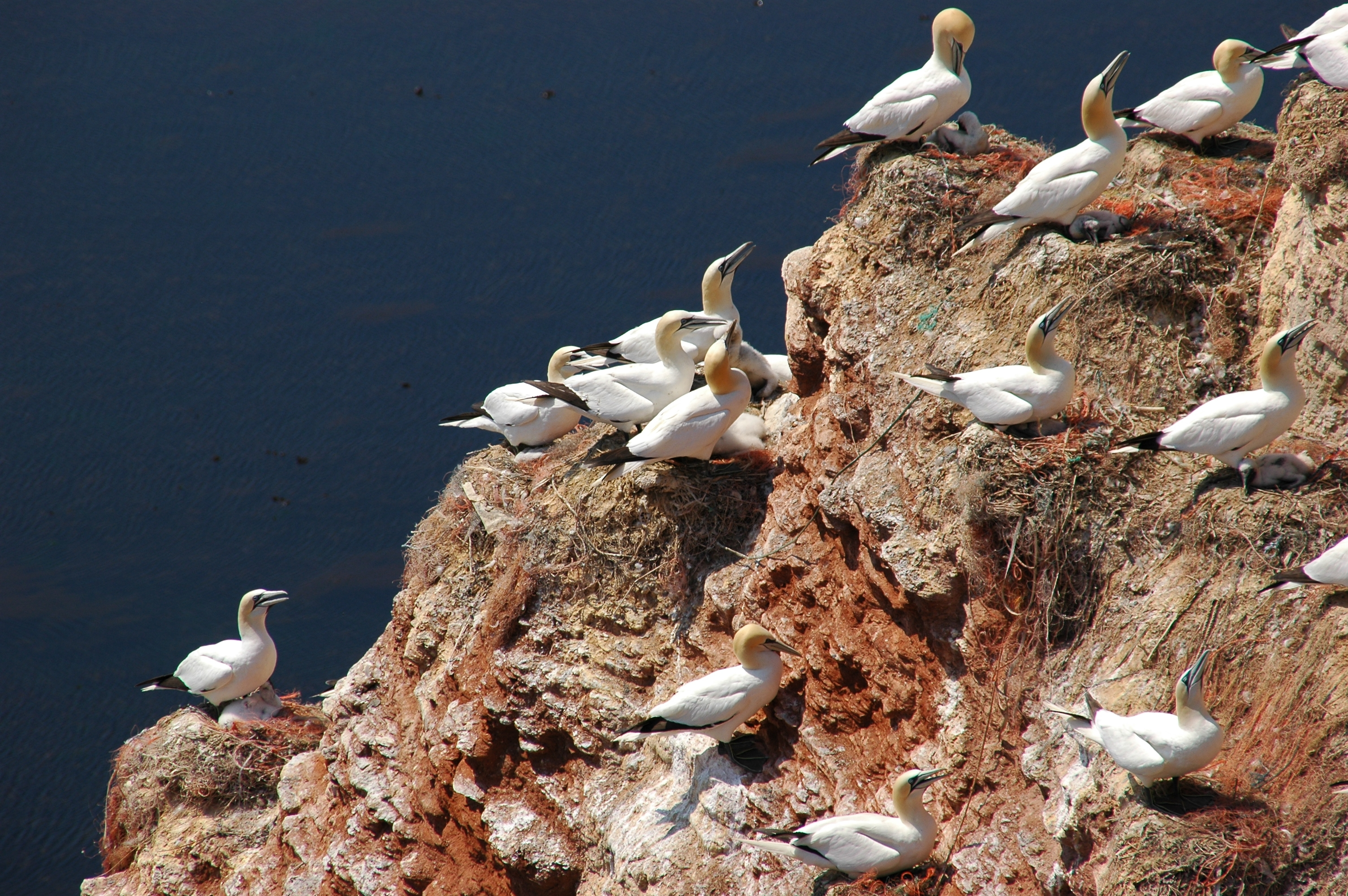
Northern gannets breed on Heligoland

The Heligoland Bird Observatory (Vogelwarte Helgoland in German), one of the world's first ornithological observatories, is operated by the Ornithologische Arbeitsgemeinschaft Helgoland e.V., a non-profit organization which was founded in 1891 to support research on the fauna of Heligoland, a small German archipelago, comprising the islands of Heligoland and Düne, in the Heligoland Bight of the North Sea. The principal research focus is on bird migration through banding studies. Over 400 species have been recorded. OAG Helgoland produces an annual bird report.

== History ==
Heligoland is on a major migration route for birds crossing the North Sea; for centuries, both those on migration and those breeding there, were an important source of food for the islanders. In the early 19th century Heligoland also became a source of bird specimens for collectors and museums. Ornithologist and artist Heinrich Gätke first visited the island in 1837 and moved there permanently in 1841 as secretary to the British Governor. He began collecting specimens of rarities for both artistic and scientific purposes. He spent most of the next 60 years studying the birds and coined the term "Vogelwarte", producing a book ("Die Vogelwarte Helgoland") on his research in 1891, with an English translation published in 1895. The modern observatory was established in 1910 by Hugo Weigold with a systematic trapping and banding program using the "Heligoland traps" he developed.
