= Soviet industry in World War II =

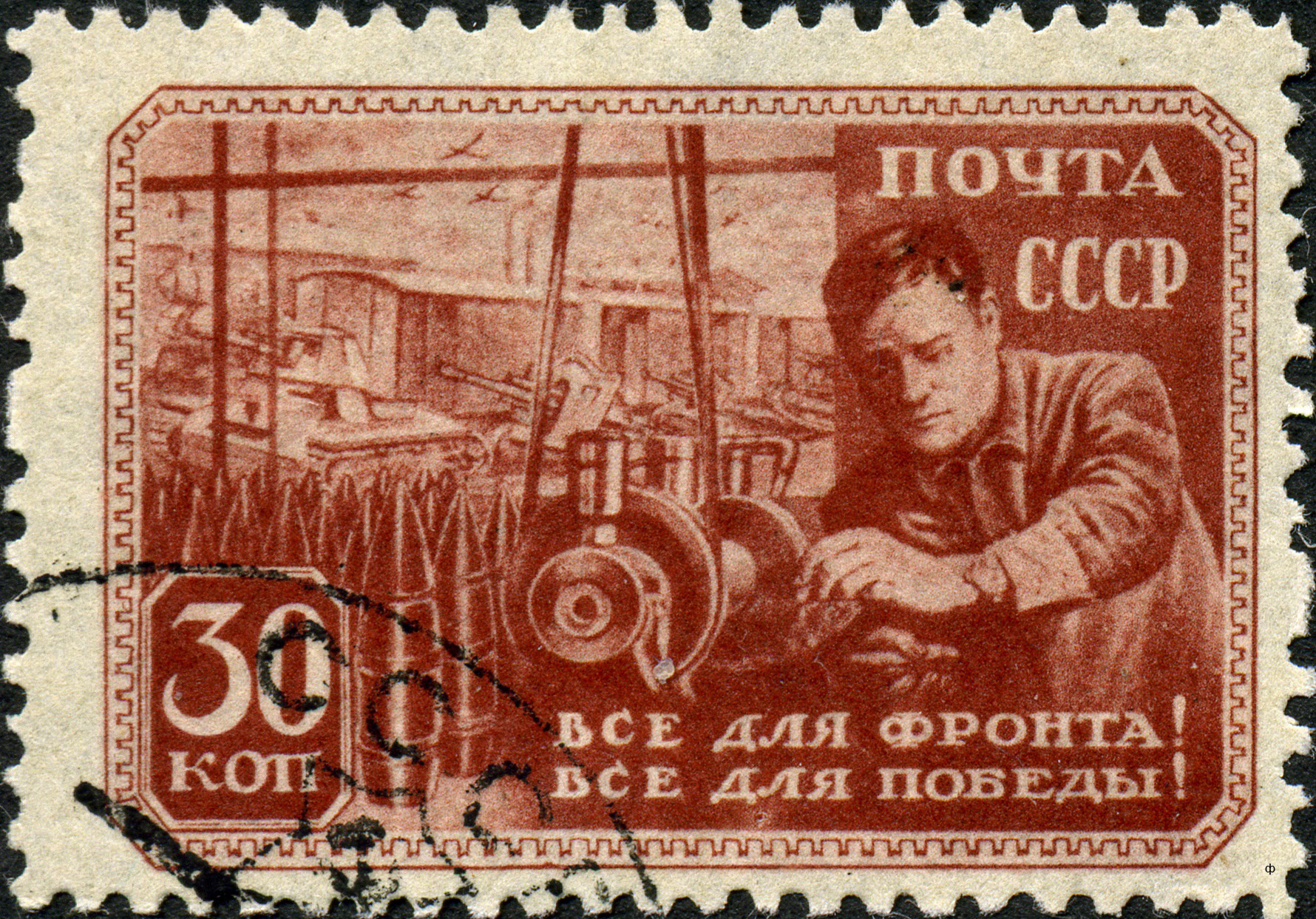
1942 Soviet postage stamp showing shell manufacture: text reads "All for the front! All for victory!"

The Soviet Union took part in World War II from 1939 until the war's end in 1945. At the start of the war, the Soviet Union suffered loss of valuable lands with economic and agricultural potential, great industrial losses and human casualties. This was mostly caused by the invasion of the Soviet Union by Axis forces in Operation Barbarossa, and it resulted in a rapid decline in industrial and agricultural production. This required the country's leadership to take urgent measures to strengthen the nation's economy, with a primary focus on the defence industries.

The Soviet Union's war effort in World War II began when the Soviet Union was invaded on the 22 of June 1941. The Soviet Union was at a disadvantage from the very beginning. This was militarily and economically challenging. Despite having such vast natural resource reserves, high quotas of the initial Five-year plans for the national economy of the Soviet Union required extensive exploitation of European Russia. As a result, the resource base in eastern regions of the Soviet Union remained largely untapped. During the first 6 months of the invasion, German forces managed to occupy or isolate territory which prior to WWII accounted for over 60% of total coal, pig iron, and aluminium production. Nearly 40% of total grain production and 60% of total livestock was lost. Moreover, this area contained 40% Soviet population before the war, 32% of the state enterprise labour force, and one-third of the fixed capital assets of the state enterprise sector. The sheer speed of the German advance meant that any Soviet evacuation efforts were troublesome. As a result of the German invasion of World War II, the Economy of the Soviet Union suffered punishing blows, with Soviet GDP falling 34% between 1940 and 1942. Industrial output did not recover to its 1940 level for almost a decade.

Eastern Front June to December 1941

== Prior to the war ==
Joseph Stalin's five-year plans hoped to industrialize the Soviet economy and were designed to overcome the weaknesses that had destroyed the Russian economy during the first world war. During the first world war, the Russian Empire collapsed due to the Russian Revolution as its mobilization had failed. It suffered lack of industrial capacity, and its peasant farmers withdrew from the market into self-sufficiency. To combat this, the five-year plans created specialized mass production facilities that guaranteed a supply of weapons for the Red Army in the second world war. The five-year plans converted peasants into only residual claimants on the available food. This in return ensured that, when and if a war broke out, the soldiers and war workers were fed first in line.

The resources allocated to the defense industry grew in the late 1930 as tensions rose across Europe. An increase in defense spending began even prior to the official start of World War II, as defense spending rose from 1937 all the way until the German invasion. The nominal budget spending on defense had almost doubled from 1937 until 1940, as it rose all the way from 17% to 33%. This meant that there was a corresponding increase in defense spending as a share of the Soviet gross national product. The growth was an increase from 8% in 1937 to 17% in 1940. In 1940 the specialized defense industry employed around 1.6 million workers and that was out of a total workforce of 14 million. There were however, even more millions of employed workers in agriculture, transport and industry that directly supplied the Red Army. In The State Planning Committee's plan, a total of nine million workers were working for defense in 1940 and their jobs in industry, agriculture, transport and construction. This was around 16% of the entire working population.

Prior to World War II, Soviet Azerbaijan was one of the world's largest producers of oil, oil products, and petroleum equipment, hugely contributing to the Soviet Union to be ranked next to the United States and Canada in oil production. Despite ongoing military actions, Baku remained the main provider of fuels and lubricants, sending 23.5 million tons of oil in the first year of the war alone. A total of 75 million tons of oil were transported for military needs throughout World War II.

== Wartime economy and governmental actions ==
As soon as the war broke out, it was clear to the Soviet government that this conflict would require a total war approach. Therefore, almost immediately, defense production was put to the maximum priority. Immediate gains in defense production came to fruition as several factors made that possible. These factors included some reserves, an immediate increase in working hours, and a mobilization of civilian workers who were previously involved as defense subcontractors. In the third quarter of 1941, production in ammunition was almost three times its level in the first quarter of the same year

On July 22, 1941. The Presidium of the Supreme Soviet of the Soviet Union adopted a decree on new martial law, which introduced labor service and regulation of the work for industrial enterprises. The next day, the mobilization plan for the production of ammunition was put into effect, and on June 24, at The Council of People's Commissars of the Soviet Union, the Council for Evacuation is created. It was transformed on December 25 of the same year into the Committee of unloading transit cargo. Under the direction of the council, from July until December 1941, the regions which lie in danger of oncoming Axis powers forces are to be evacuated to the Urals, the Volga region, Siberia and Central Asia. In total 2,593 industrial enterprises, more than 12 million people, about 2.4 million livestock, significant food reserves, agricultural machinery and objects of cultural value were evacuated.

According to an official report: "Beginning in September, and right to the end of 1941, a decline in industrial output occurred. At the end of 1941, industrial production amounted to only one-half of the prewar level. The output of nonferrous rolled metal, cable products, and ball bearings, had almost completely ceased. Average daily railway shipments at the beginning of 1942 had fallen to 36-37 thousand truckloads, i.e. one-third of prewar shipments." The following table shows indexes of development in the years of the war as a percentage of the very same indexes of development in 1940.

Major indexes of the development of the Soviet Union's national economy in 1941-45 (1940 = 100%)
| | 1941 | 1942 | 1943 | 1944 | 1945 |
|---|---|---|---|---|---|
| National income | 92 | 66 | 74 | 88 | 83 |
| Gross industrial output | 98 | 77 | 90 | 104 | 92 |
| Including Production of aircraft, tanks, armaments, and munitions | 140 | 186 | 224 | 251 | — |
| Gross agricultural output | 62 | 38 | 37 | 54 | 60 |
| Number of workers and employees | 88 | 59 | 62 | 76 | 87 |
| Incomes of state budget | 98 | 92 | 113 | 149 | 168 |

June 26, 1941 the Supreme Soviet of the Soviet Union adopted a new decree "On the working hours of workers and service members in wartime," which introduced overtime work with work on holidays and weekends. Furthermore, there were mobilization and national economic plans that were approved and they were all aimed at increasing military output. On June 30, 1941, the Committee for the Distribution of Labor (later the Committee for Accounting and the Distribution of Labor) was created under the Bureau of the Council of Constituencies. From 1942 till July 1945 this committee attracted more than 3 million people from the urban and rural population to permanent work in industry, agriculture and transport. Then more than 2.1 million adolescents were sent to educational institutions of labor reserves. This brought the average annual number of workers and service members to 28.6 million people in 1945, or to 84% of the 1940 level. In addition, in accordance with the resolutions of the State Defense Committee on January 10 and October 7, 1942, the workers' columns were mobilized Germans (over 120 thousand people), deported from various parts of the country

To ensure the transition of the country's economy to a total war economy, the Gosplan were sent to large industrial centers and defense enterprises. In September 1941, the People's Commissariat of the tank industry was created under the leadership of the production organizer V. A. Malyshev, and in November the People's Commissariat of mortar weapons headed by an experienced engineer, an energetic production worker Dmitry Ustinov. In order to accelerate the commissioning of industry facilities. On September 11, a resolution was adopted "On construction of industrial enterprises in wartime conditions" On December 26, 1941, the Presidium of the Supreme Soviet of the Soviet Union adopted a decree "On the responsibility of workers and employees of military industry enterprises for unauthorized departure from enterprises" and on February 13, 1942, on "Mobilization for work in industry and construction." In accordance with these decrees, workers and employees were recognized as mobilized for the period of the war. In April 1942, the mobilization also touched the villagers. The main part of the mobilized were women.

The following table shows the employment of Soviet workforce during the years of the war starting with 1940, a year before the war. A drop of 13.8 million workers in total working population from 1940 to 1941 is due to the loss of European populated areas such as Ukrainian Soviet Socialist Republic and Byelorussian Soviet Socialist Republic and due to large casualties on the front line which needed to be replenished. The working population picks back up again by almost 10 million from 1943 to 1944, this is when the Red Army began to liberate previously occupied Soviet territories.

Soviet Employment, 1940–1945 in millions
| | 1940 | 1941 | 1942 | 1943 | 1944 | 1945 |
| Agriculture | 49.3 | 36.9 | 24.3 | 25.5 | 31.3 | 36.1 |
| Industry | 13.9 | 12.8 | 8.8 | 9.1 | 10.3 | 11.7 |
| Transport and communications | 4.0 | 3.5 | 2.4 | 2.4 | 3.0 | 3.6 |
| Civilian services | 9.1 | 7.7 | 4.8 | 5.1 | 6.5 | 7.7 |
| Military services | 5.0 | 7.1 | 11.3 | 11.9 | 12.2 | 12.1 |
| Working Population | 87.2 | 73.4 | 55.1 | 57.5 | 67.4 | 76.0 |

By the end of the first half of 1942, over 1200 evacuated enterprises had begun to operate in the Urals. From December 1941, the government managed to stop the decline in production that initially occurred due to industrial losses, and from March 1942 production again began to grow. The country's main economic and military industrial base was now based in the regions a bit east of the Volga, regions that were primarily in the Urals. When comparing the economy of Ural regions in 1942 and in 1940 (before the war), it becomes apparent that electricity production was increased by more than 2 times, coal production increased 2.3 times and steel production increased 2.4 times. In March 1942, the output of military equipment and machinery in the eastern regions reached a point which equaled production across the entire Soviet Union at the start of the war. In June of the same year, the US and the Soviet Union signed an agreement to lend-lease supplies. Known today as Lend-Lease. Thanks to Lend-Lease, during the war years, the Soviet Union received about 14.8 thousand aircraft, 7.1 thousand tanks, 8.2 thousand anti-aircraft guns, a large number of cars, tractors and other vital supplies.

The country's agriculture was in a difficult situation. The gross grain harvest in 1941 decreased by almost 1.7 times when compared to 1940. This was largely due to the loss of the Ukrainian Soviet Socialist Republic, which produced a notable portion of the harvest for the Soviet Union. On July 20, 1941, the Political Bureau of the Central Committee of the Communist Party of the Soviet Union approved a plan to increase the sowing of winter crops in the Volga region, Siberia and Kazakhstan. Thanks to the measures taken, the gross grain harvest in the eastern regions, including the Volga region, doubled in 1942 compared with 1940, yet, total harvest it still lagged behind significantly to prewar period.

Having lost the western part of the country, significant problems arose transport, specifically rail transport. Transport by rail was most important for the military and throughout the war it took the brunt of military traffic. In addition, the most extensive railway network was in the occupied western part of the country. On June 24, 1941, a military train schedule was introduced in order to ensure the operation of railway transport. At the end of 1942, 35 locomotive columns of the People's Commissariat of Railways of the Soviet Union reserve were created. At the same time, over three thousand kilometers of new railways were built. All this significantly increased the freight turnover allowing for faster relocation of forces, production and increased efficiency. The freight turnover increased by one and a half times compared with the first quarter of 1942.

An economic turning point for the better came in 1943, when gross industrial production increased by 17% compared with 1942. In the Urals and Siberia, metallurgical plants were being built and expanded at an accelerated pace. In 1944, the volume of industrial production when compared with the volume of industrial production in 1940 was at 103-104%. In 1943-1945 mass production of the newer military equipment was carried out. In 1943, when it became clearer that the war was going in allied favor and that the Soviet Union would not outright lose the war, one of the most important tasks became to restore the national economy. Measures were taken to develop the production of agricultural equipment and increase the acreage. On 26 May 1943, The State Defense Committee made a resolution on Restoring Railways in Liberated Areas and up until the end of the war, 50 thousand km of main railway lines, 2.5 thousand stations and sidings were restored. A significant contribution to meeting the needs of the front was made by the population of the country, which, despite the hardship and deprivation, worked in all sectors of the economy. In addition, 94.5 billion rubles were collected in the form of voluntary contributions during the years of the war, 1941 till 1945.

=== Gulag production ===
The gulag was the main supplier of labor for many defense commissariats. By the middle of 1944, prisoners worked at 640 industrial enterprises in the country. Along with the Stakhanovite movement, a movement to motivate the workers to produce more than quota amounts, and new forms of socialist competition recommended by the gulag were widely used - front watches, labor salutes, personal accounts for issuing over-the-board products to the fund of the High Command. Most of the prisoners, showing patriotic feelings, filed an application to be sent to the front. During the three years of war, the production of all types of ammunition by the gulag amounted to over 70,700,000 units, this included mortars, hand grenades, mines etc.

== Production Soviet Union vs European Axis ==
The Soviet Union extracted less resources in almost every category except when it came to Crude oil and Nickel.

Resources
| Country | Coal | Iron ore | Crude oil | Steel | Aluminium | Nickel | Zinc |
|---|---|---|---|---|---|---|---|
| Soviet Union | 590.8 | 71.3 | 110.6 | | 0.263 | 0.069 | 0.384 |
| Germany | 2,420.3 | 240.7 | 33.4 | | 1.9 | 0.046 | 2.1 |
| Italy | 16.9 | 4.4 | | | | | |
| Hungary | 6.6 | 14.1 | 3.1 | | | | |
| Romania | 1.6 | 10.8 | 25.0 | | | | |
| Total Axis | 2445.4 | 270 | 61.5 | | 1.9 | 0.046 | 2.1 |

All figures in millions of tonnes

"A well established predictor of military victory in great power warfare is GDP (Gross Domestic Product)." Soviet Union's GDP is significantly lower when compared to the axis countries in Europe.

Gross domestic product
| Country | 1941 | 1942 | 1943 | 1944 | 1945 |
|---|---|---|---|---|---|
| Soviet Union | 359 | 274 | 305 | 362 | 343 |
| German Reich | 412 | 417 | 426 | 437 | 310 |
| Italy | 167 | 168 | 160 | 140 | 115 |

=== Land forces ===
| Power | Tanks & SPGs | Armoured vehicles | Other vehicles | Artillery | Mortars | Machine guns | Personnel |
|---|---|---|---|---|---|---|---|
| Soviet Union | 119,769 | | 1,556,199 | 516,648 | 363,012 | 1,477,400 (excluding 6 million sub-machine guns) | 34,401,807 |
| Germany and territories | 67,429 | 49,777 | 159,147 | 73,484 | 104,864 | 1,000,730 | 16,540,835 |
| Hungary | 973 | | | 447 | | 4,583 | |
| Romania | 91 | 251 | | 2,800 | | 10,000 | |
| Italy | 3,368 | | 83,000 | 7,200 | 22,000 | | |
| Europe Axis Total | 71861 | 50,028 | 242,147 | 83,931 | 182,864 | 1,015,313 | |

=== Air forces ===
| Power | Total Aircraft | Fighters | Attack | Bombers | Recon | Transport | Training | Other | Personnel |
|---|---|---|---|---|---|---|---|---|---|
| USSR | 136,223 | 22,301 | 37,549 | 21,116 | | 17,332 | 4,061 | | |
| Germany and territories | 133,387 | 57,653 | 8,991 | 28,577 | 5,025 | 8,396 | 14,311 | 11,361 | 3,402,200 |
| Romania | 1,113 | 513 | 272 | 128 | 0 | 200 | 0 | 0 | |
| Italian Empire | 13,402 | 6,157 | 34 | 3,381 | 388 | 2,471 | 968 | 3 | |
| Other | 9,849 | 881 | 4 | 395 | 318 | 1,880 | 5,145 | 57 | |
| Axis | 157751 | 65204 | 9301 | 32481 | 7293 | 12947 | 19524 | 11418 | |

A different source on number of weapons manufactured between the Soviet Union and Germany mango

Output of major types of weapons in the Soviet Union and Germany (the latter with satellite and occupied countries)
| | Soviet Union | | Germany | |
| | July 1, 1941: July 1, 1945 | Annual average | 1941-44 | Annual average |
|---|---|---|---|---|
| Infantry mortars | 347,900 | 86,900 | 68,000 | 17,000 |
| Guns | 188,100 | 47,000 | 102,100 | 25,500 |
| Tanks and self-propelled guns | 95,099 | 23,774 | 53,800 | 13,450 |
| Combat aircraft | 108,028 | 27,007 | 78,900 | 19,725 |
| Motor vehicles and prime movers | 205,000 | 51,000 | 375,000 | 93,700 |

When looking at military production of the Soviet Union and the Axis countries in Europe it is clear that whilst there exists a gap in GDP and resources extracted, there is a clear numeric superiority of military weapons being produced by the USSR. This is largely to do with the way Soviets designed and mass-produced weapons.
