= Lev Belopolsky =

Soviet ornithologist and marine biologist

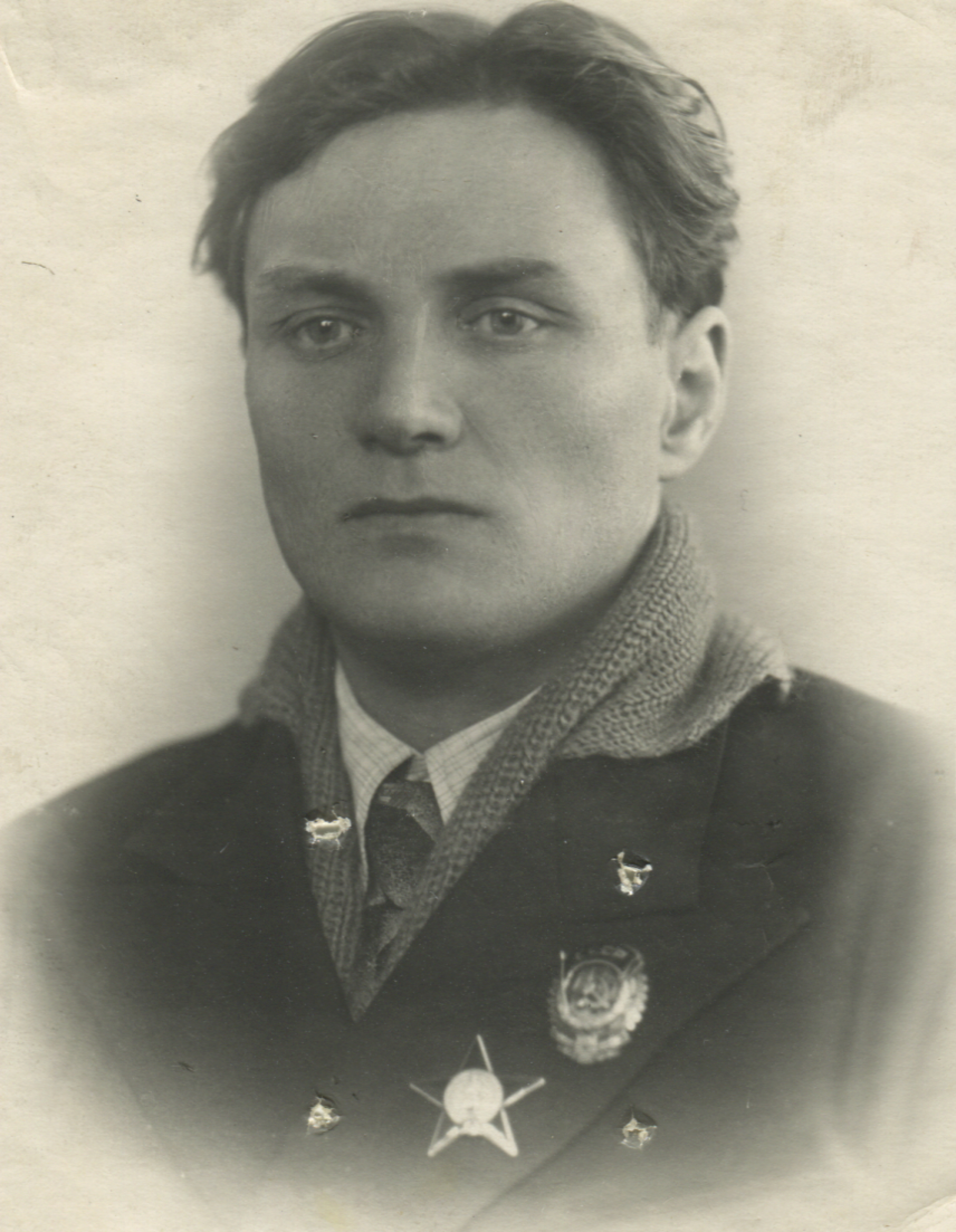
- Belopolsky in 1941
- Born: Lev Osipovich Belopolsky; July 4, 1907; Saint-Petersburg
- Died: November 5, 1990 (aged 83); Leningrad
- Education: Moscow State University (1930)
- Scientific career
- Fields: Biology
- Workplaces: Moscow University Professor

Lev Osipovich Belopolsky (Russian: Лев О́сипович Белопо́льский; 4 July 1907 – 5 November 1990) was a Soviet ornithologist and marine biologist who founded the Biological Station of the Zoological Institute in Rybachiy. He worked extensively on polar ecology, especially in the Barents Sea and the Curonian Spit, and produced works on the biology of the birds of the region.

== Life and work ==
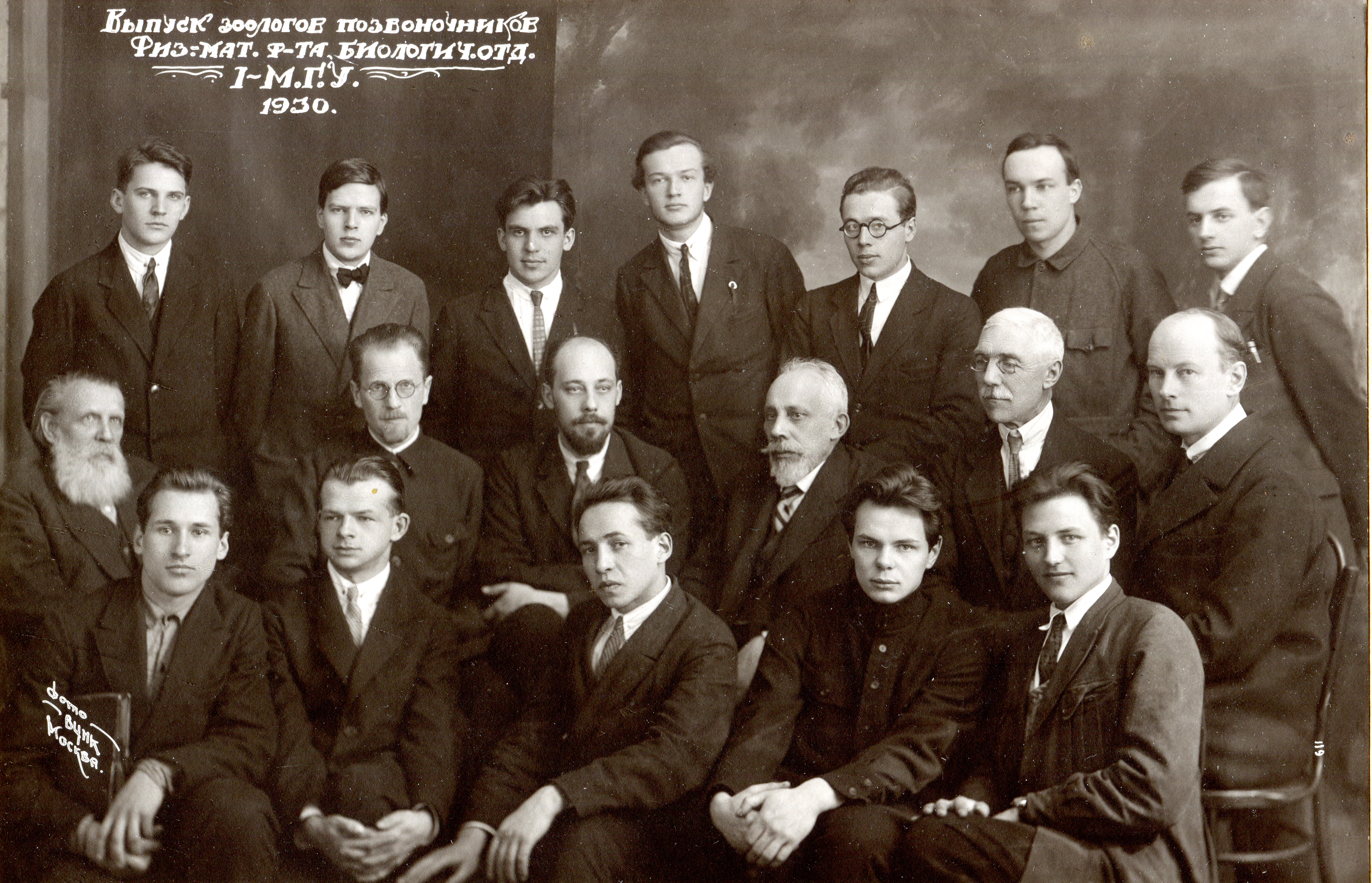
Belopolsky as a student (front row leftmost) in 1930

Belopolsky was born in St. Petersburg. His father Osip Romanovich was from Odessa and worked in the book publishing industry. His mother Agata Andreevna née Yakovleva was from Kyakhty and taught at the Agricultural Economics Institute in Detskoye Selo (Pushkin). He was interested in sea birds from an early age and even while studying at the Moscow State University, he made trips into the Arctic. He graduated in 1930 and along with his brother Valentin he spent time in the north of Kamchatka studying the hunting of sea animals. In 1932-1934 he joined worked at the All-Union Arctic Institute and took part in oceanographic research aboard the icebreakers A. Sibiryakov (1932) and Chelyuskin (1933–1934); the latter expedition ended in disaster with the ship being crushed by ice and the rescue involved the survivors building a runway on ice for the rescue aircraft to land. The incident was famous in its time and used by Joseph Stalin for propaganda. Belopolsky was one of the survivors and he received high honours from the Soviet Union for his participation. At the height of World War II in 1942 Belopolsky was appointed commander of the Murmansk base and was involved in helping find food for personnel posted there. This included eggs and meat of guillemots. He also continued to collect zoological specimens while his wife Maria Mikhailovna née Volkova collected and studied parasites. In 1951 he wrote a dissertation on the birds of the Barents Sea. In 1949 Lev's brother Valentin was arrested and shot by government forces for allegedly spying and in 1950 Valentin's wife and his father Osip was arrested. Lev's mother Agata who had in the meantime married Professor Okhotin remained free. In 1952 Lev Belopolsky was also suspected of "wrongdoings", expelled from the communist party and exiled to Novosibirsk. He also had to return the awards received from Stalin's government. He became a stove maker in Novosibirsk and it was only after Stalin's death that he was released and rehabilitated. In 1953 he returned to join the Zoological Institute at Leningrad. The director-professor Yevgeny Pavlovsky allowed him to continue his research in the Baltic. His work on the sea birds of the Barents Sea was restarted and his thesis defence took place in 1954. His work had examined the ecology of sea birds with examinations of their diet based on gut analysis. The work was also translated into English in 1961.

In 1956, Belopolsky persuaded the Soviet authorities to reestablish the Rossitten Bird Observatory, and then became its director.

Belopolsky's work was principally in ecology, however he described a new subspecies Parus atricapillus anadyrensis in 1932.
