= Hugo Weigold =

German zoologist

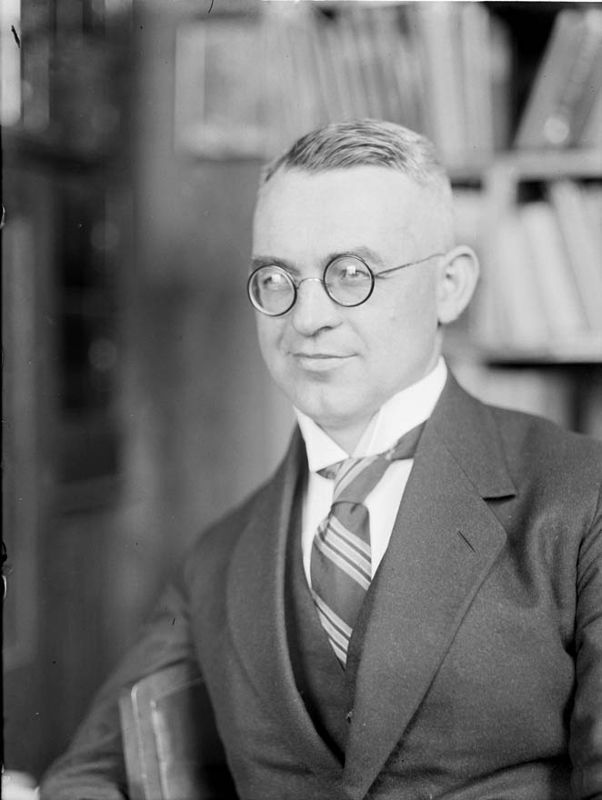
Max Hugo Weigold in 1927

Max Hugo Weigold (27 May 1886 – 9 July 1973) was a German zoologist and a pioneer bird bander who worked at the Heligoland Bird Observatory, one of the world's first bird-ringing sites.

Weigold was born in Dresden. He studied natural sciences and geography in Jena and Leipzig. Here he was influenced by Ernst Haeckel, Richard Woltereck, Otto zur Strassen and Carl Chun. He worked for the Scientific Commission for Marine Research in Heligoland, a German island in the North Sea, where he continued the work of Heinrich Gätke (who died in 1897) in bird migration studies, setting up the bird observatory in 1910 to trap and band the migratory birds passing through the island.

For six years Weigold carried out zoological research in China and Tibet and was the first Westerner to see a live giant panda in the wild, buying a cub (which did not survive for long) while part of the Stoetzner Expedition in 1916. He later became Director of Natural Sciences at the Lower Saxony State Museum in Hanover. He died in Bruckberg, Lower Bavaria.

Weigold collected a large number of specimens, nearly 3800 during his 1913–16 expedition and 1000 from 1931 to 1932. He named 5 subspecies alone and 7 co-authored with Otto Kleinschmidt. There were 13 other new descriptions including ones with Ernst Hartert and Erwin Stresemann. About six bird species and seven vertebrates are named after him.
