= List of bird observatories =

Ornithological station

Bird observatories are centres for the study of bird migration and bird populations. They are usually focused on local birds, but may also include interest in far-flung areas. Most bird observatories are small operations with a limited staff, many volunteers and a not-for-profit educational status. Many bird observatories conduct bird ringing or bird banding (term in the United States).

== Australia ==
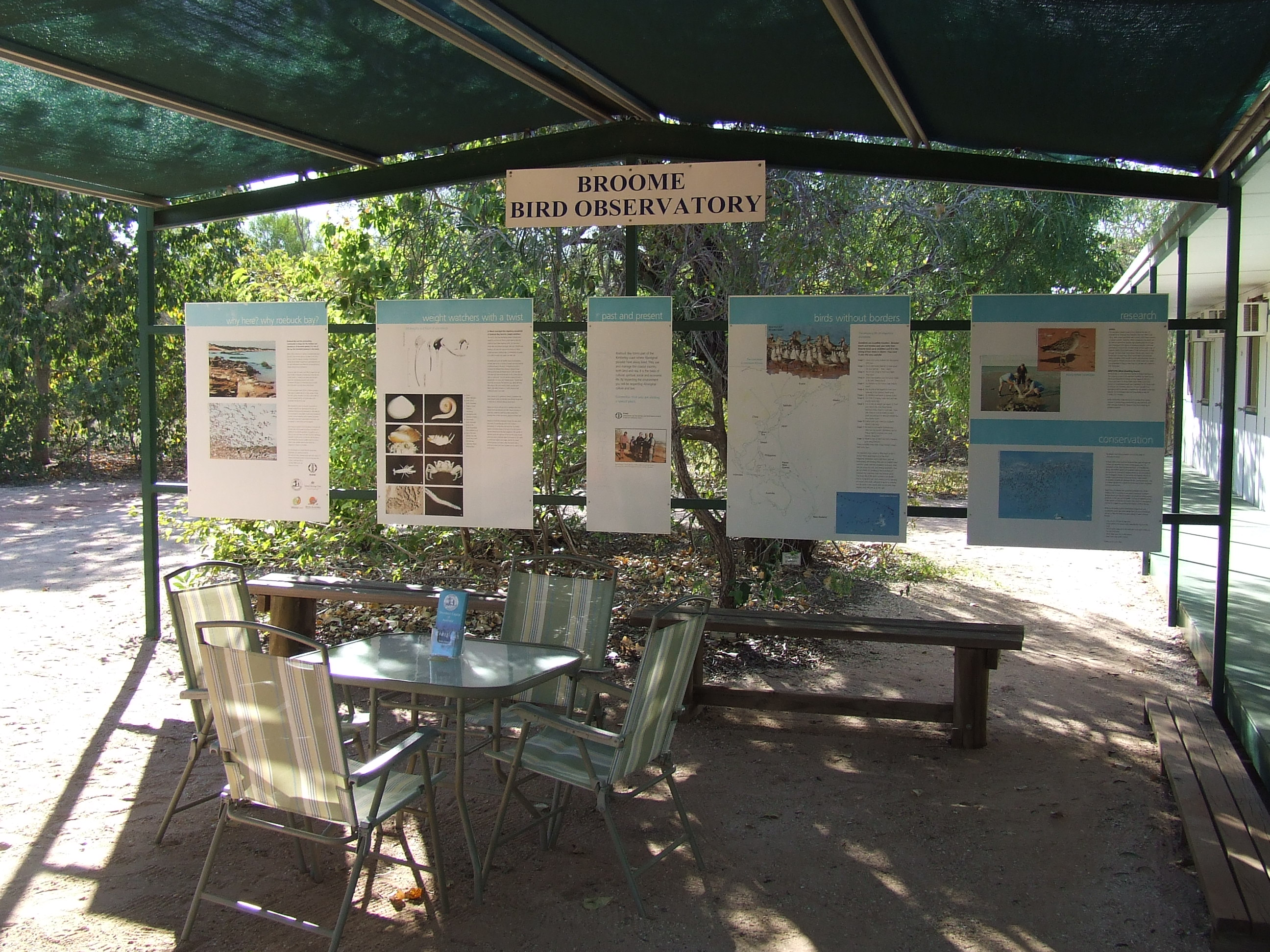
Information boards at Broome Bird Observatory, Western Australia

- Barren Grounds Bird Observatory, New South Wales
- Broome Bird Observatory, Western Australia
- Eyre Bird Observatory, Western Australia
- Rotamah Island Bird Observatory, Victoria

== Benin ==
- Station Ornithologique du Bénin

== Brazil ==
- Mantiqueira Bird Observatory (Observatório de Aves da Mantiqueira)

== Britain and Ireland ==
The United Kingdom's first bird observatory was established in 1933 by Ronald Lockley in the Welsh island of Skokholm. This is a list of members of the Bird Observatories Council of Britain and Ireland.

- Alderney Bird Observatory, Alderney
- Bardsey Bird and Field Observatory, Bardsey Island
- Calf of Man Bird Observatory, Calf of Man
- Cape Clear Bird Observatory, Cape Clear
- Copeland Bird Observatory, Copeland
- Dungeness Bird Observatory, Dungeness
- Fair Isle Bird Observatory, Fair Isle
- Filey Bird Observatory, Filey
- Flamborough Bird Observatory, Flamborough Head
- Gibraltar Point Bird Observatory, Gibraltar Point
- Hilbre Bird Observatory, Hilbre Islands
- Holme Bird Observatory, Holme next the Sea
- Isle of May Bird Observatory & Field Station, Isle of May
- Landguard Bird Observatory, Landguard
- North Ronaldsay Bird Observatory, North Ronaldsay
- Portland Bird Observatory and Field Centre, Portland
- SBBOT Field Centre, Sandwich Bay
- Skokholm Bird Observatory, Skokholm
- Spurn Bird Observatory, Spurn
- Walney Bird Observatory, Walney Island

== Canada ==
Observatories belonging to the Canadian Migration Monitoring Network:

- Holiday Beach Migration Observatory
- Rocky Point Bird Observatory
- Vaseux Lake Bird Observatory
- Mackenzie, British Columbia|Mackenzie Nature Observatory (www.MackenzieNatureObservatory.ca)
- Lesser Slave Lake Bird Observatory
- Beaverhill Bird Observatory
- Inglewood Bird Sanctuary
- Last Mountain Bird Observatory
- Delta Marsh Bird Observatory
- Thunder Cape Bird Observatory
- Whitefish Point Bird Observatory
- Long Point Bird Observatory
- Haldimand Bird Observatory
- Toronto Bird Observatory
- Prince Edward Point Bird Observatory
- Innis Point Bird Observatory
- Observatoire d'oiseaux de Tadoussac
- Point Lepreau
- Brier Island Bird Migration Research Station
- Atlantic Bird Observatory
- Gros Morne National Migration Monitoring Station
- Bruce Peninsula Bird Observatory
- St. Andrews Banding Station
- McGill Bird Observatory / Observatoire d'Oiseaux de McGill

== Colombia ==
- Chocó Bird Observatory

== Costa Rica ==
- Costa Rica Bird Observatories

== Czech Republic ==
- Červenohorské sedlo in Hrubý Jeseník

== Estonia ==
- Kabli Bird Observatory
- Vaibla Bird Observatory

== France ==
- Ligue pour la Protection des Oiseaux

== Germany ==
- Randecker Maar Observatory for Bird and Insect Migration, Swabian Jura, Baden-Württemberg
- Heligoland Bird Observatory
- Rossitten Bird Observatory (the world's first, now in Russia's Kaliningrad Oblast)

== Greece ==
- Antikythira Bird Observatory

== Hungary ==
- Ócsa Bird Ringing Station

== Israel ==
- Jerusalem Bird Observatory

== Italy ==
- Capri Bird Observatory

== Jordan ==
- Aqaba Bird Observatory

== México ==
- Yucatán Bird Observatory

== Nepal ==
- Kosi Bird Observatory

== Peru ==
- Manu Bird Observatory

== Senegal ==
- Station Ornithologique du Delta du Sénégal

== Sweden ==
- Falsterbo Bird Observatory
- Ottenby Bird Observatory

== Switzerland ==
- Swiss Ornithological Institute

== United States ==
- Alaska Bird Observatory, Alaska
- Bird Conservancy of the Rockies, Colorado
- Berkshire Bird Observatory, Massachusetts
- Biocore Prairie Bird Observatory, Wisconsin
- Black Swamp Bird Observatory, Ohio
- Braddock Bay Bird Observatory, New York
- Cape Fear Bird Observatory, North Carolina
- Cape May Bird Observatory, New Jersey
- Cape Romain Bird Observatory, South Carolina
- Chipper Woods Bird Observatory, Indiana
- Coastal Virginia Wildlife Observatory, Virginia
- Derby Hill Bird Observatory, New York
- Golden Gate Raptor Observatory, California
- Great Basin Bird Observatory, Nevada
- Gulf Coast Bird Observatory, Texas
- Hawk Mountain Sanctuary, Pennsylvania
- Hawk Ridge Bird Observatory, Minnesota
- Hornsby Bend Bird Observatory, Texas
- Humboldt Bay Bird Observatory, California
- Institute for Bird Populations, California
- Intermountain Bird Observatory(formerly Idaho Bird Observatory), Idaho
- Klamath Bird Observatory, Oregon
- Manomet Center for Conservation Sciences, Massachusetts
- Missouri River Bird Observatory, Missouri
- Norman Bird Sanctuary, Rhode Island
- Audubon Society of Rhode Island, Rhode Island
- Point Reyes Bird Observatory, California
- Powdermill Avian Research Center, Pennsylvania
- Rio Grande Valley Bird Observatory, Texas
- Rouge River Bird Observatory, Michigan
- San Francisco Bay Bird Observatory, California
- Sand Bluff Bird Observatory, Illinois
- Sandy Hook Bird Observatory, New Jersey
- Southeastern Arizona Bird Observatory, Arizona
- The Institute for Bird Populations, California
- Whitefish Point Bird Observatory, Michigan
