= Antikythera =

Greek island

Antikythera Αντικύθηρα
- Municipal unit
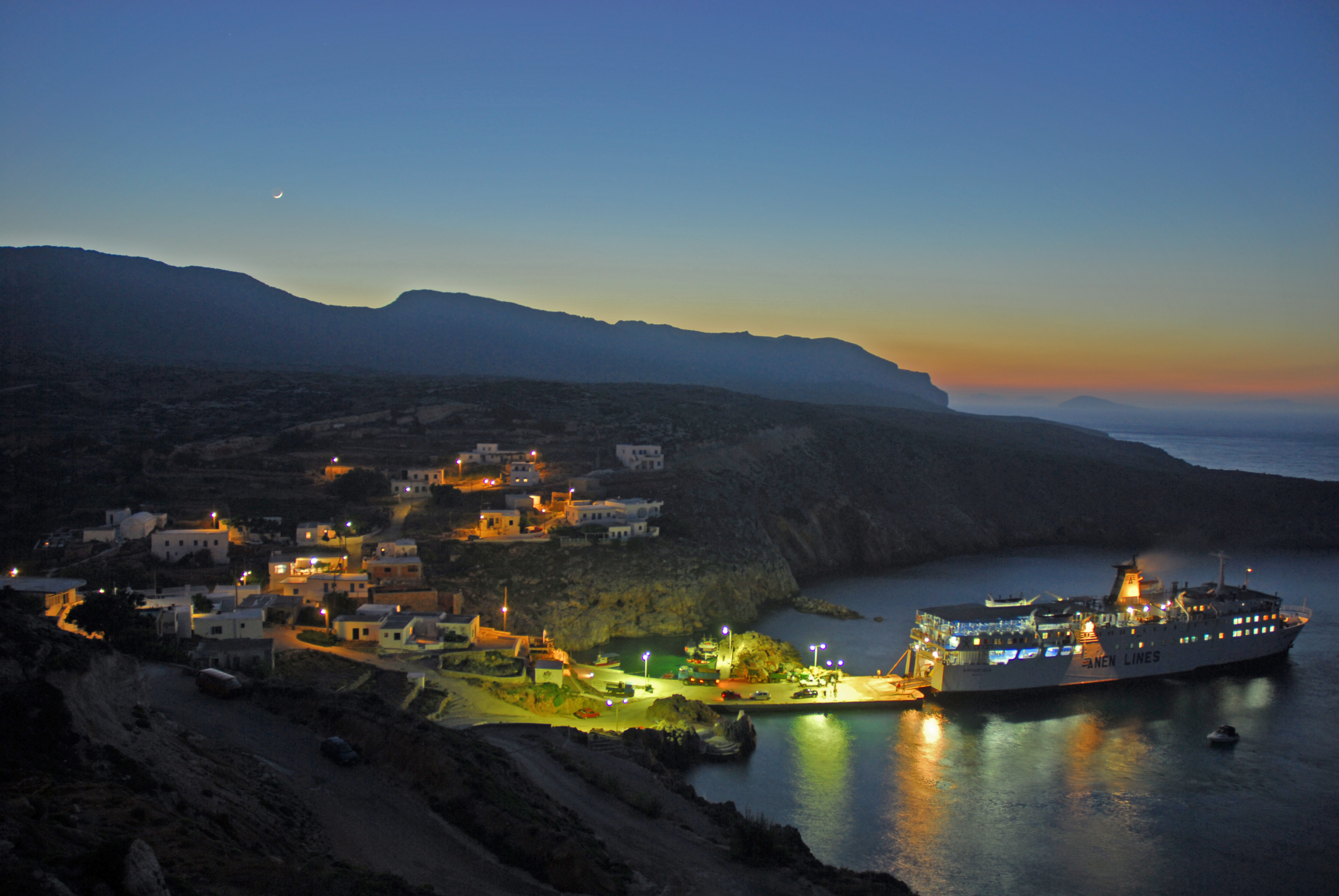
- Antikythera's harbour Potamos

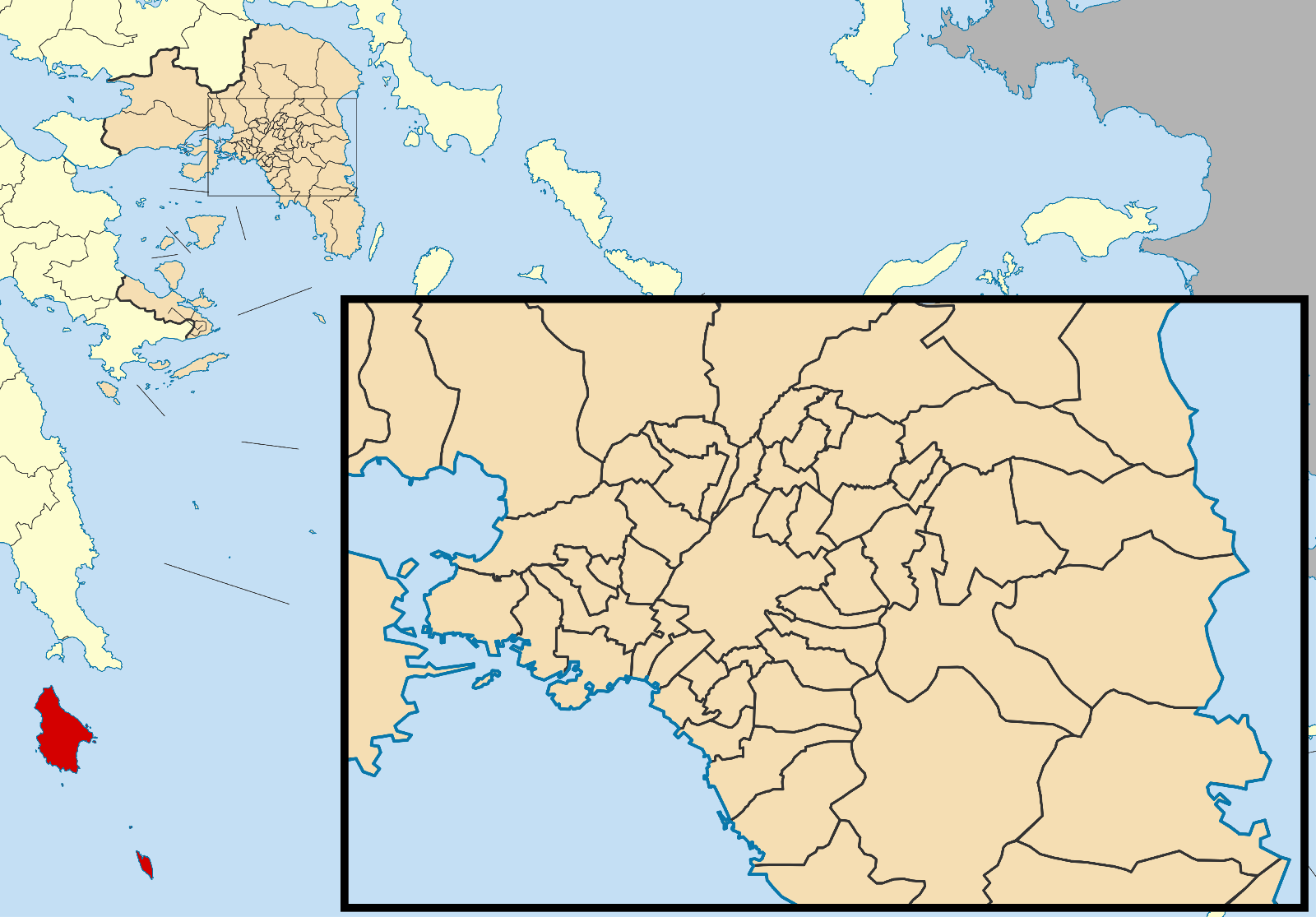
- Kythera and Antikythera (south) within Attica

- Location within Greece
- Coordinates: 35°52′N 23°18′E
- Country: Greece
- Administrative region: Attica
- Regional unit: Islands
- Municipality: Kythira

Area
  - Municipal unit: 20.43 km^{2} (7.89 sq mi)

Population (2021)
  - Municipal unit: 39
  - Municipal unit density: 1.9/km^{2} (4.9/sq mi)
- Time zone: UTC+2 (EET)
  - Summer (DST): UTC+3 (EEST)
- Postal code: 801 00
- Area code: 27360
- Vehicle registration: Z
- Website: www.antikythira.gr

Antikythera (/ˌæntɪkɪˈθɪərə/ AN-tik-ih-THEER-ə, US also /ˌæntaɪkɪˈ-/ AN-ty-kih-; Modern Greek: Αντικύθηρα, romanized: Antikýthira, IPA: [andiˈciθira]) (Note: Ancient Greek: Ἀντικύθηρα, IPA: [antikýtʰɛːra]; lit. 'opposite Kíthira'.) or Anticythera, known in antiquity as Aigilia (Αἰγιλία), is a Greek island lying on the edge of the Aegean Sea, between Crete and Peloponnese. Since the 2011 local government reform, it is part of the municipality of Kythira island.

North of Antikythera is the Kythira-Antikythira Strait, through which Mediterranean water enters the Sea of Crete.

Its land area is 20.43 square kilometres (7.89 square miles), and it lies 38 kilometres (24 miles) south-east of Kythira. It is the most distant part of the Attica region from its heart in the Athens metropolitan area. It is lozenge-shaped, 10.5 km (6.5 mi) NNW to SSE by 3.4 km (2.1 mi) ENE to WSW. It is notable for being the location of the discovery of the Antikythera mechanism and for the historical Roman-era Antikythera wreck.

Its main settlement and port is Potamós (pop. 34 inhabitants in the 2011 census). The only other settlements are Galanianá (pop. 15), and Charchalianá (pop. 19). Antikythera is periodically visited by the Ablemon Nautical Company ferry F/B Ionis on its route between Piraeus (Athens) and Kissamos-Kastelli on Crete.

== History ==
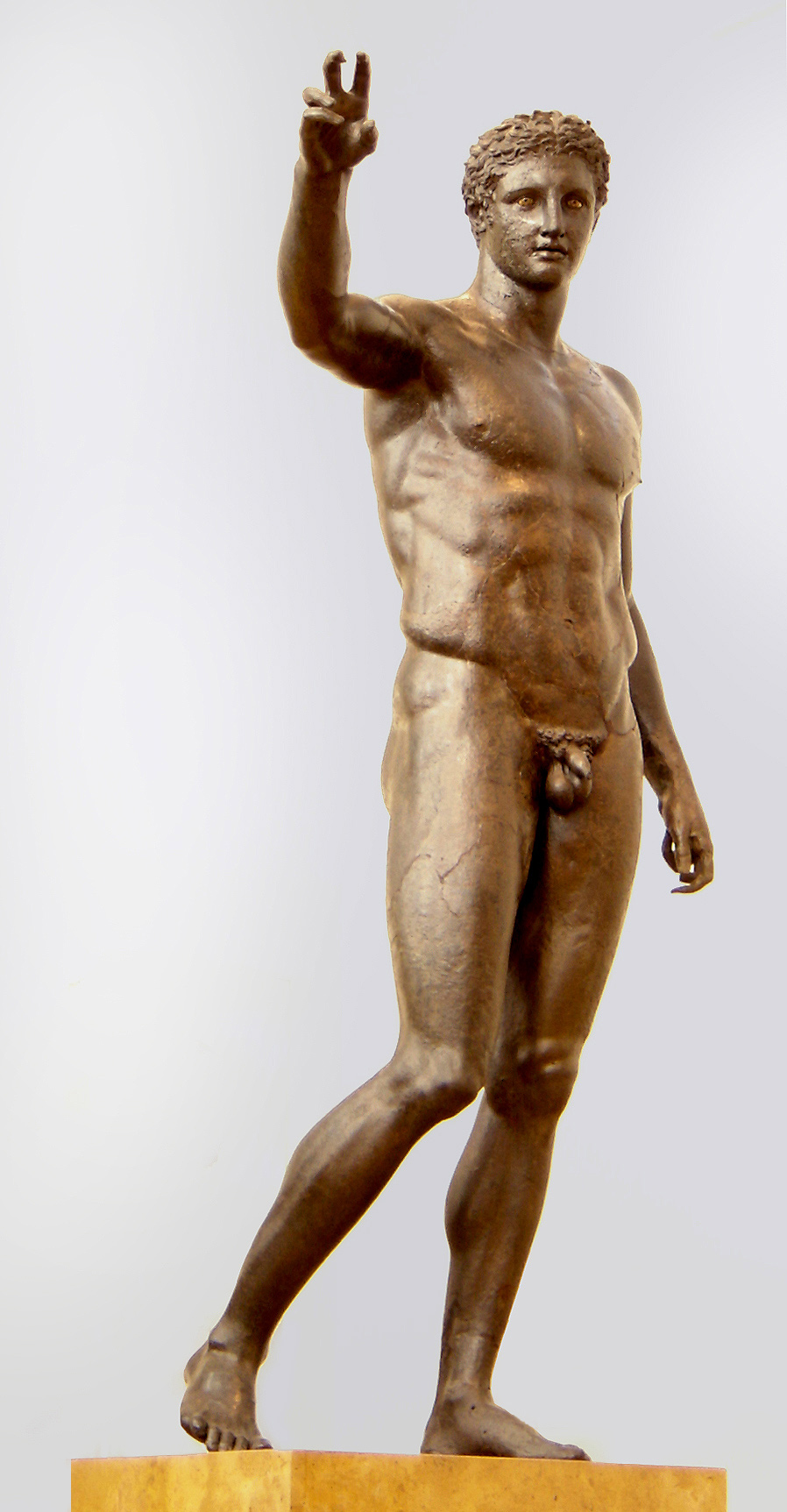
Antikythera Ephebe; bronze c. 340–330 BC, National Archaeological Museum of Athens

The earliest known inhabitants (5th or 4th millennium BC) were likely seasonal hunters who traveled there to exploit the presence of migratory birds. The population of the island then changed frequently as it was settled and abandoned several times, including a period of significant influence by Cretan culture during the Bronze Age. In antiquity, the island of Antikythera was known as Aegilia or Aigilia (Αἰγιλία), Aegila or Aigila (Αἴγιλα), or Ogylos (Ὤγυλος).

Between the 4th and 1st centuries BC, it was used as a base by a group of Cilician pirates until their destruction by Pompey the Great. Their fort can still be seen atop a cliff to the northeast of the island. The archaeology of the island has been thoroughly surveyed and the data made openly available for further study.

Antikythera is one of the few islands in the Aegean which were never ruled by the Ottoman Empire, as the Ottomans did not consider the small island a worthwhile conquest. Nevertheless, it was noted on Ottoman maps as Küçük Çuha, a name that has persisted in modern Turkish.

Antikythera, known as Cerigotto in Italian, was administered by the Venetians as part of the Ionian Islands, despite being several hundred kilometres away from the main Ionian archipelago. The Venetians held out in Antikythera until 1800 while the rest of the Ionian Islands had fallen to Napoleonic France in 1797. It became a British protectorate in 1815 as part of the United States of the Ionian Islands. The island was then ceded to Greece under the Treaty of London (1864).

From 1864 to 1912, Antikythera was the southernmost point of Greece, as Crete and the surrounding islands including Gavdos were then part of the Ottoman Empire.

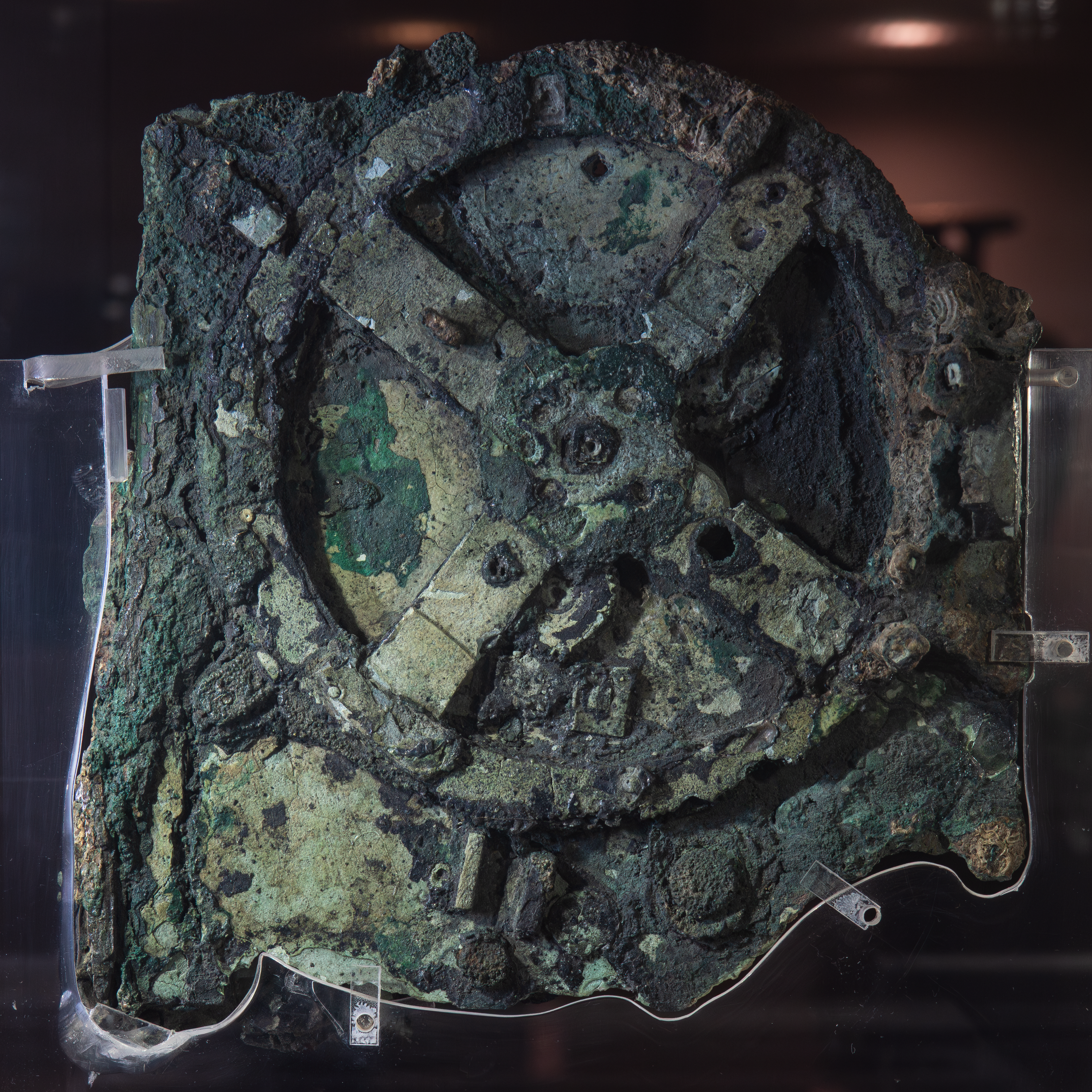
The Antikythera mechanism (Fragment A – front)

Antikythera is most famous for being the location of the 1900 discovery of the Antikythera wreck, from which the Antikythera Ephebe and Antikythera mechanism were recovered. The Antikythera mechanism is an ancient mechanical calculator (sometimes described as the first mechanical computer) designed to calculate astronomical positions which has been dated to about 205 BC. Technological artifacts of similar complexity did not reappear until a thousand years later.

== Fauna ==
Antikythera is a very important stop-over site for migratory birds during their seasonal movements, due to its geographical position and certain features (a longitudinal island, with a north–south direction and very low human impact). Furthermore, the island hosts the largest breeding colony of Eleonora's falcon (Falco eleonorae) in the world. The importance of Antikythera for studying bird migration led to the creation of Antikythera Bird Observatory (A.B.O) by the Hellenic Ornithological Society. The island, along with its associated islets, has been recognised as an Important Bird Area (IBA) by BirdLife International. The island also has a large population of wild goats.

== Climate Observation Center (PANGEA) ==
Following an agreement among European Investment Bank, the Kithira-Antikithira Commission of Inland Property, the National Observatory of Athens, the Municipality and the Greek Public, a total fund of €25 million will be used to install one of the largest Climate Observatory Centers in Europe. The project has also gained the support of Cosmote and Niarchos Foundation.

== Notable people ==
- Andreas Anagnostakis (1826–1897) physician
