= Antikythira Bird Observatory =

Bird observatory in Greece

The Antikythera Bird Observatory, ABO (Greek Ορνιθολογικός Σταθμός Αντικυθήρων, ΟΣΑ) in Antikythira is the only bird observatory in Greece, developing a constant effort ringing activity during bird migration periods. It is run by the Hellenic Ornithological Society HOS (Ελληνική Ορνιθολογική Εταιρία ΕΟΕ), the Greek partner of BirdLife International. The ABO operates both on the island and the wider maritime area around it, as well as on the two adjacent islets of Pouri and Lagouvardos.

Ornithological research on Antikythira has been carried out by the HOS since 1997, but the Antikythira Bird Observatory was established only three years later, in 2000. Researchers and volunteers have since then been working on the island during the spring and autumn migration periods. The ABO is founded by the A.G. Leventis Foundation.

Main research objectives of the observatory are the study and monitoring of bird migration with a focus on the protection and conservation of migratory birds at a national and international level. Another key objective is the study of the local birds, as well as the habitats used by both local and migratory birds.
