= Prince Edward Point Bird Observatory =

Bird observatory in Canada

- IUCN category Ia (strict nature reserve)
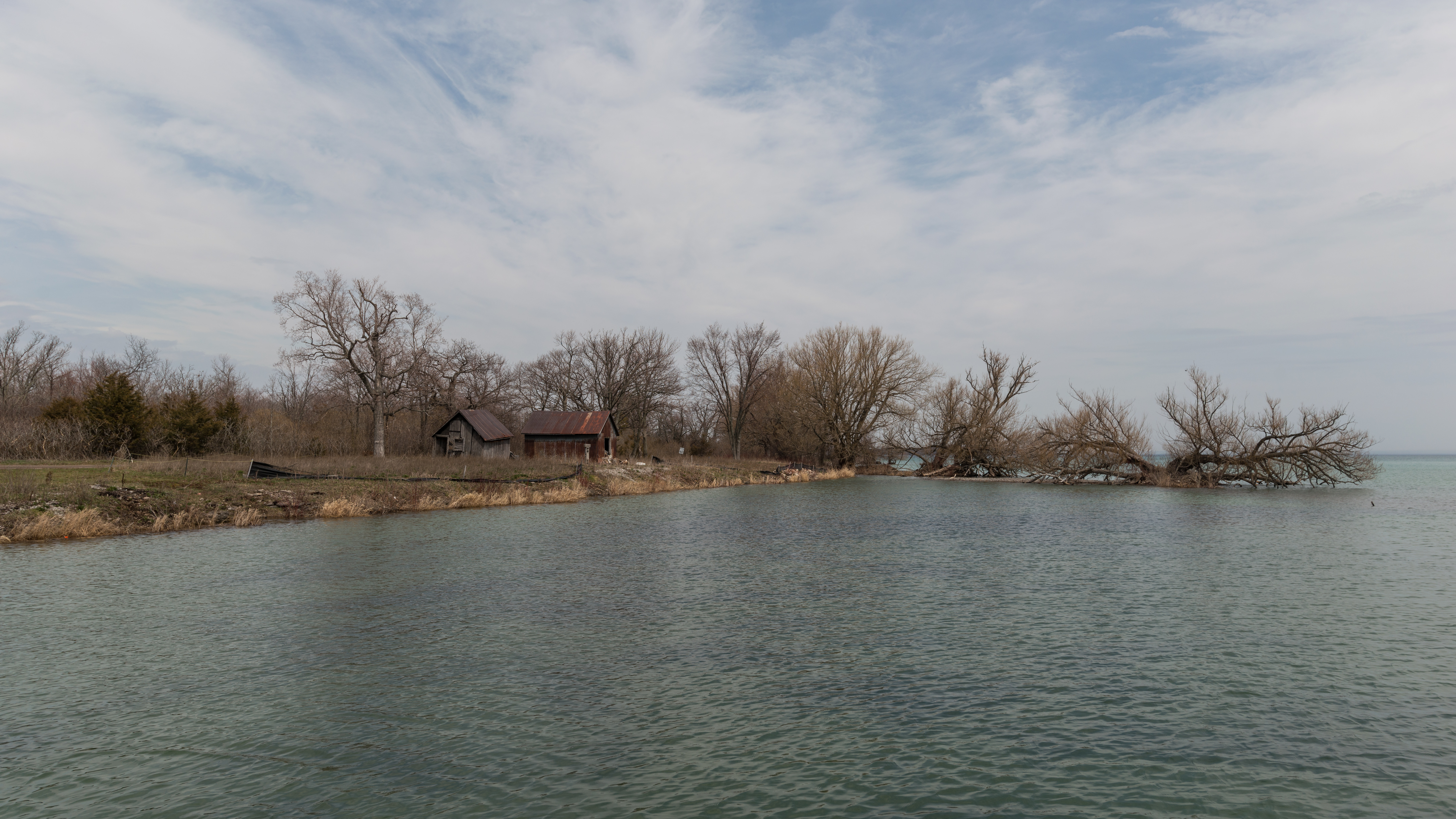

- Location within Southern Ontario
- Location: Eastern Ontario, Canada
- Nearest city: Picton
- Coordinates: 43°56′00″N 76°51′30″W
- Area: 560 ha (1,400 acres) (Prince Edward Point National Wildlife Area)
- Established: 1995 (observatory); 1978 (National Wildlife Area)

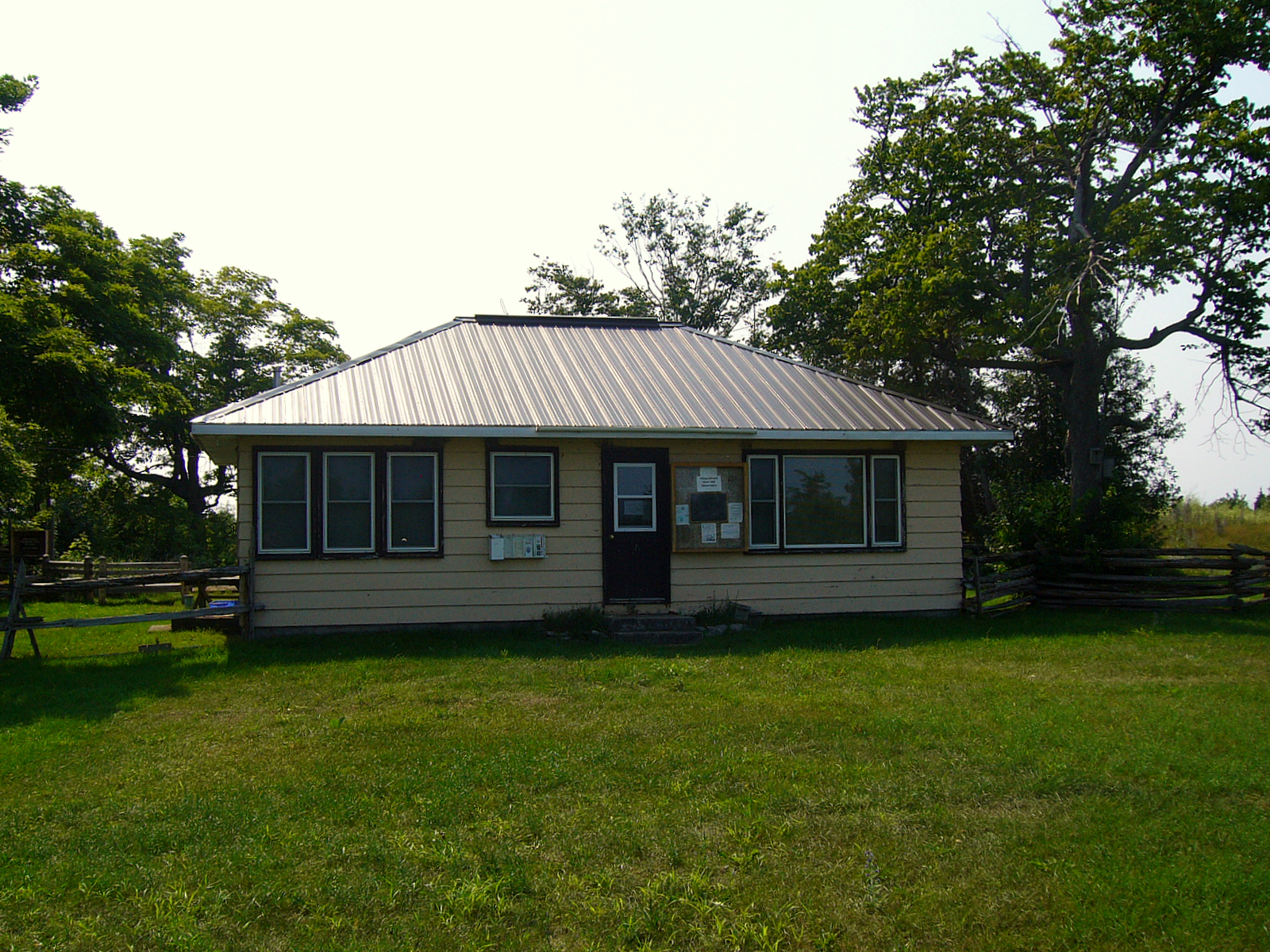
The Prince Edward Point Bird Observatory main building

The Prince Edward Point Bird Observatory is a bird observatory located in the Prince Edward Point National Wildlife Area, located on Prince Edward Point in the south-east corner of Prince Edward County, Ontario, Canada. The National Wildlife Area was established in 1978 covering 560 hectares. The observatory was established in 1995 to monitor bird migrations across the point, continuing the work of the Kingston Field Naturalists who performed similar work in the 1970s and 1980s. The observatory was designated a Globally Important Birding Area in 1998 by the Canadian Nature Federation and Bird Studies Canada. It is also an International Monarch Butterfly Reserve.

== Role ==
The observatory's purpose is to observe the migratory bird populations. It does so through a combination of bird banding, daily censuses and observations.

Funding for these activities comes from a variety of sources. In 2002, the Ontario Trillium Foundation awarded the observatory $150,000 to renovate the research station, stabilize the bird banding operations and develop outreach activities. Smaller grants have included a $5,000 donation from the George Cedric Metcalfe Foundation for a modern bird banding facility and a $7,000 grant from the Helen McCrea Peacock Foundation to construct blinds and observation platforms.

== Ecology ==
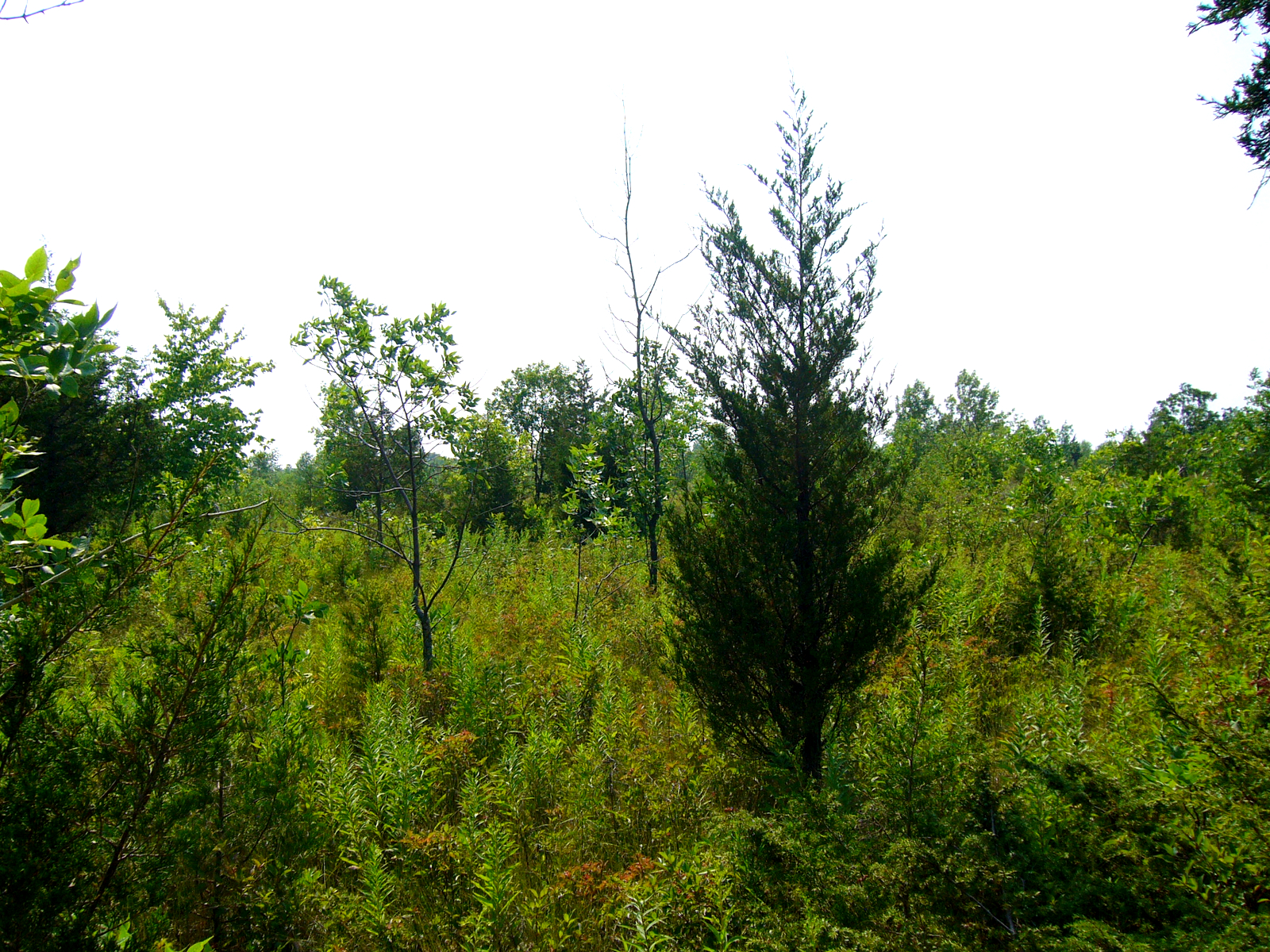
Scrublands like this are common around the observatory

Prince Edward Point extends about 10 kilometers into Lake Ontario. Off the edges of the point there are both shoals and deeper waters. The point itself is limestone bedrock with a thin covering of unconsolidated Farmington loam topsoil.

The point features an interior with primarily grassland and scrubland. Also present are small amounts of wooded swamps, shrub-lined ponds, mixed forests and alvars. Both sandy and rocky shores are found along the south beaches of the point, while the north beaches are prominent limestone cliffs. Some of the key species in the ecosystem of the point include fringed gentian, viper's bugloss, butterfly weed, jewelweed, black-eyed susan and small yellow lady's slipper. Rare vascular plants found on Prince Edward Point include Ontario aster, downy wood mint and clammyweed.

Prince Edward Point is a concentration point of bird migrations over the Great Lakes. Over 300 species of birds have been recorded at Prince Edward Point. Most of these birds are recorded in migration, however 74 species of bird have been recorded nesting on the point.

=== Bird species coverage ===
The site experiences heavy bird migration. Single-day totals of greater scaup, long-tailed duck, and white-winged scoters have exceeded 1% of their total North American populations. Single-day totals of common birds exceed 10,000 individuals for species like tree swallows, long-tailed ducks, and yellow-rumped warblers. The single-day count of dark-eyed juncos has exceeded 70,000 birds.

This table contains the spring bird counts, averaged over 1995–1999. The priority of various species depends on how well their breeding grounds are covered by surveys such as the Breeding Bird Survey, with birds whose breeding grounds are well surveyed being of lesser priority. The Mean DET is the daily estimated total number of birds migrating across Prince Edward Point, and the Mean Band is the number of birds banded in the season. This table includes only species with at least ten individuals counted per season, across not less than five days.

Table of species

| Species | Priority | Mean DET | Mean Band |
|---|---|---|---|
| Alder flycatcher | A | 23 | 0 |
| Blackpoll warbler | A | 32 | 4.6 |
| Lincoln's sparrow | A | 58 | 26.4 |
| Magnolia warbler | A | 185 | 119.8 |
| Savannah sparrow | A | 24 | 0.8 |
| Swainson's thrush | A | 48 | 32.8 |
| Tennessee warbler | A | 12 | 4.4 |
| Wilson's warbler | A | 21 | 14.2 |
| Yellow-bellied flycatcher | A | 22 | 6.8 |
| Yellow-bellied sapsucker | A | 17 | 2.8 |
| American tree sparrow | B | 10 | 3.4 |
| Fox sparrow | B | 11 | 2.6 |
| Myrtle warbler | B | 4244 | 224.4 |
| Ruby-crowned kinglet | B | 553 | 243 |
| Rusty blackbird | B | 169 | 0.6 |
| Swamp sparrow | B | 45 | 25.2 |
| Dark-eyed junco | B | 580 | 115.4 |
| Western palm warbler | B | 25 | 6.6 |
| White-crowned sparrow | B | 107 | 47.8 |
| White-throated sparrow | B | 514 | 177.4 |
| American redstart | C | 118 | 47 |
| Barn swallow | C | 322 | 8 |
| Black-and-white warbler | C | 38 | 21 |
| Black-throated green warbler | C | 124 | 25.4 |
| Blue-headed vireo | C | 15 | 5.2 |
| Canada warbler | C | 22 | 12.2 |
| Chipping sparrow | C | 264 | 59.4 |
| Clay-colored sparrow | C | 33 | 0 |
| Cliff swallow | C | 1179 | 9.8 |
| Common yellowthroat | C | 178 | 48 |
| Eastern kingbird | C | 50 | 1.6 |
| Least flycatcher | C | 60 | 25.8 |
| Ovenbird | C | 41 | 25 |
| Red-eyed vireo | C | 51 | 15.4 |
| Tree swallow | C | 712 | 1.2 |
| Warbling vireo | C | 15 | 3.4 |
| Yellow warbler | C | 463 | 75 |
| American crow | D | 172 | 0.2 |
| American robin | D | 775 | 39.8 |
| Belted kingfisher | D | 23 | 0 |
| Black-capped chickadee | D | 119 | 15.4 |
| Brown creeper | D | 98 | 44.2 |
| Cedar waxwing | D | 225 | 8.4 |
| Common grackle | D | 642 | 37 |
| Downy woodpecker | D | 41 | 2.6 |
| Eastern phoebe | D | 67 | 6.8 |
| European starling | D | 447 | 0.8 |
| Golden-crowned kinglet | D | 643 | 86 |
| Hairy woodpecker | D | 25 | 2.2 |
| Hermit thrush | D | 134 | 68 |
| Northern flicker | D | 158 | 8.6 |
| Purple finch | D | 20 | 22.4 |
| Red-winged blackbird | D | 681 | 31.6 |
| Song sparrow | D | 677 | 53.6 |
| Winter wren | D | 35 | 13 |
| Baltimore oriole | E | 161 | 18 |
| Black-throated blue warbler | E | 55 | 20.6 |
| Blackburnian warbler | E | 31 | 9.8 |
| Blue-grey gnatcatcher | E | 26 | 1 |
| Bobolink | E | 66 | 0.4 |
| Chestnut-sided warbler | E | 38 | 23.4 |
| Eastern wood-pewee | E | 31 | 4.6 |
| Grey catbird | E | 257 | 57.8 |
| Great crested flycatcher | E | 50 | 5 |
| House wren | E | 66 | 16.4 |
| Indigo bunting | E | 13 | 4.4 |
| Nashville warbler | E | 112 | 45.2 |
| Northern rough-winged swallow | E | 91 | 1 |
| Rose-breasted grosbeak | E | 102 | 29.2 |
| Ruby-throated hummingbird | E | 50 | 0 |
| Scarlet tanager | E | 24 | 4.2 |
| Veery | E | 28 | 16.6 |
| Wood thrush | E | 26 | 13.4 |
| American goldfinch | F | 588 | 68.8 |
| Blue jay | F | 291 | 166.4 |
| Brown thrasher | F | 56 | 6.4 |
| Brown-headed cowbird | F | 1184 | 154.6 |
| Eastern meadowlark | F | 41 | 0 |
| Eastern towhee | F | 23 | 3.8 |
| Field sparrow | F | 87 | 9.4 |
| House finch | F | 87 | 15.8 |
| Mourning dove | F | 140 | 3.6 |
