= Kosi Bird Observatory =

Bird Observatory in Nepal

Kosi Bird Observatory (KBO) and field education center (26°46’57"N/087°08’21"E) is the first and the sole bird observatory in Nepal established by Himalayan Nature (HN : a not-for-profit research and conservation organization). KBO lies in Sunsari District, East Nepal, to the north-east of Koshi Tappu Wildlife Reserve, the first Ramsar site of the country. It lies on a "prime migratory corridor".
