= Institute for Bird Populations =

American non-profit organization

The Institute for Bird Populations (IBP)
- Founded: 1989; 37 years ago
- Founder: David F. DeSante
- Type: 501(c)(3)
- Purpose: Bird monitoring and research, avian conservation science, bird-banding, and monitoring training
- Location(s): PO Box 518; Petaluma, CA 94953; United States
- Region served: United States, Canada, Mexico, Central America, the Caribbean, South America
- Key people: Executive Director: Rodney B. Siegel
- Website: www.birdpop.org

The Institute for Bird Populations (IBP), based in Petaluma, California, is a non-profit organization dedicated to studying and monitoring bird populations, and providing land managers and policy makers with information needed to better manage those populations.

== About ==
The Institute for Bird Populations (IBP) is a 501(c)(3) nonprofit conservation science organization founded in 1989 to study the causes of bird declines. IBP's first major initiative was the Monitoring Avian Productivity and Survivorship (MAPS) program, a continent-wide collaborative network of bird monitoring stations. Other flagship programs include the Monitoreo de Sobrevivencia Invernal (MoSI) program to study the ecology of Neotropical migratory birds on their non-breeding grounds, and its regional science and conservation programs.

IBP works in many parts of the globe, including the Neotropics and Pacific Islands, studying birds and other wildlife. IBP collaborates with government agencies and NGOs in a variety of fields to assess the effects of land management actions, fire, and other ecological stressors on bird populations, and to prescribe practical solutions. We place a high emphasis on publishing our results in peer-reviewed journals.

=== Goals ===
IBP's primary goals are to:

- Conduct top-tier scientific research that answers pressing ecological and land management questions that support effective conservation of birds and other wildlife.
- Monitor the health of bird populations across their full annual cycle, yielding large data sets that are resources for conservation scientists worldwide.
- Help train the next generation of avian conservationists.

The Institute for Bird Populations is a member organization of the North American Bird Conservation Initiative (NABCI).

== Programs ==
- Monitoring Avian Productivity and Survivorship Program: The Monitoring Avian Productivity and Survivorship (MAPS) Program is a collaborative, continent-wide network of hundreds of constant-effort mist netting stations. Analyses of the resulting banding and demographic data provide critical information on the ecology, conservation, and management of North American landbirds and the factors responsible for changes in their populations.
- Monitoreo de Sobrevivencia Invernal Program (MoSI): Many North American landbirds spend the non-breeding season in the northern Neotropics where relatively little is known about their ecology. IBP and our international partners operate the Monitoreo de Sobrevivencia Invernal (MoSI) Program to provide information on the non-breeding habitat needs of migrant and resident birds in the Neotropics. MoSI stations have operated in 15 countries from Mexico to Colombia.
- Sierra Nevada Science and Conservation Program: Our Sierra Nevada program encompasses a wide variety of projects studying, monitoring, and conserving birds throughout the Sierra Nevada region, often in partnership with government agencies or other land managers. Areas of emphasis include determining the effects of land management practices, wildfire, and environmental change on bird populations; conducting surveys for rare or imperiled species; monitoring avian population trends in national parks; and formulating conservation strategies that solve management problems and safeguard species.
- Pacific Northwest Science and Conservation Program: In our flagship program in the Pacific Northwest, IBP collaborates with the National Park Service to monitor avian population trends in six national parks, including some of the jewels of the National Park system. This long-term monitoring program is designed to answer park management needs as well as understand avian population responses to climate change and other stressors.
- Southwest Science and Conservation Program: The American Southwest is home to IBP's newest regional science and conservation program, with initial efforts focusing on long-term bird population monitoring at Grand Canyon and several other national parks in the region; and a pilot study incorporating autonomous recording units to study bird populations on protected lands in remote areas of the Mojave Desert.
- Pollinator Ecology and Conservation: Wildlife that pollinate flowers provide critical ecosystem services that are disproportionately important compared to the diminutive size of the pollinators. Alarmingly, populations of many pollinators in the Sierra Nevada and around the world are declining, including various native bumble bee species. IBP has initiated multiple studies of bumble bee ecology, Rufous Hummingbird, and other pollinators of the region.
- Molt and Plumage Studies: Accurately determining the age and sex of captured birds is crucial in assessing population trends and demographic rates such as productivity and survival. IBP is a world leader in avian plumage and molt studies and has pioneered many novel applications of this work to conservation and management questions.
- Bird Bander Training: IBP offers beginning and advanced bird bander training and the opportunity for participants to learn or improve their skills in the set-up and operation of mist nets; bird-handling; in-hand aging and sexing techniques; and data scoring and recording using MAPS protocol and forms. IBP trainers are available to teach custom classes organized by host institutions.
- Burrowing Owl Research and Monitoring: Though no longer active, IBP's Burrowing Owl program spearheaded California-wide population surveys during the early 1990s and then again during 2006–2007.
