= Hellenic Ornithological Society =

Greek non-governmental body

The Hellenic Ornithological Society (HOS; Greek: Ελληνική Ορνιθολογική Εταιρεία, romanized: Ellinikí Ornithologikí Etaireía) is a Greek non-governmental body dedicated solely to the conservation of wild birds and their habitats in Greece. Established in 1982, it operates as a non-profit organisation and serves as the Greek representative of BirdLife International. The society is also responsible for managing the Antikythira Bird Observatory.
