= Caribbean Journal of Science =

- Discipline: Multidisciplinary
- Language: English

Publication details
- History: 1961–present
- Publisher: University of Puerto Rico at Mayagüez
- Frequency: Biannual
- Impact factor: 0.200 (2016)

Standard abbreviations
- ISO 4: Caribb. J. Sci.

Indexing
- CODEN: CRJSA4
- ISSN: 0008-6452
- LCCN: 66098238

Links
- Journal homepage

The Caribbean Journal of Science is a biannual peer-reviewed open-access scientific journal publishing articles, research notes, and book reviews related to science in the Caribbean, with an emphasis on botany, zoology, ecology, conservation biology, geology, archaeology, and paleontology. The journal was established in 1961 with the sponsorship of the College of Arts and Sciences of the University of Puerto Rico at Mayagüez.

== Abstracting and indexing ==
The journal is abstracted and indexed in Biological Abstracts, BIOSIS Previews, Current Contents/Agriculture, Biology & Environmental Sciences, Science Citation Index Expanded, Scopus, and The Zoological Record. According to the Journal Citation Reports, the journal has a 2016 impact factor of 0.200.
