= Great Basin Bird Observatory =

Nonprofit organization in Nevada, US

The Great Basin Bird Observatory is an ornithological nonprofit organization based in Reno, Nevada. Founded in 1997, its mission is to conserve birds and their habitats in Nevada and adjoining regions through partnerships, applied research, and education.

The Great Basin Bird Observatory was founded as a non-partisan conservation science organization. Its first, and for many years only, project was the first comprehensive Nevada Breeding Bird Atlas. For the atlas project, field work was completed between 1997 and 2000, and the results were published by the University of Nevada Press in 2007.

Since 2002, the Great Basin Bird Observatory has focused on bird monitoring and conservation science. Its Nevada Bird Count program aims to integrate all landbird monitoring in the state. Several conservation planning and effectiveness-monitoring projects are also on its current roster of activities, including bird monitoring along the Lower Colorado River as part of the Lower Colorado River Multi-Species Conservation Program, assisting in bird conservation planning for the Walker River Basin, long-term monitoring of the Lower Truckee River and its riparian-zone restoration sites, and many smaller inventory and planning projects in National Wildlife Refuges and similar high-priority areas. Research projects conducted by the Great Basin Bird Observatory include several telemetry tracking projects of elf owl, pinyon jay, and greater sage-grouse, and models of distribution, population densities, and habitat use for a large variety of birds of the Intermountain West and Southwest.

Beyond these projects, the Great Basin Bird Observatory is also actively involved in national efforts such as the Partners in Flight initiative, the Avian Knowledge Alliance, and several regional wildlife conservation science initiatives and government programs. One example of these efforts is the 2010 completion of the Nevada Comprehensive Bird Conservation Plan for the Nevada Partners-in-Flight chapter. In 2010, the observatory partnered with the Nevada Department of Wildlife and several other organizations to develop a wildlife plan for the state.
