= Guinea fowl (disambiguation) =

Guinea fowl are birds of the family Numididae, including:

- Black guinea fowl (Agelastes niger)
- Crested guinea fowl (Guttera pucherani)
- Helmeted guinea fowl (Numida meleagris)
  - Domestic guinea fowl
- Plumed guinea fowl (Guttera plumifera)
- Vulturine guinea fowl (Acryllium vulturinum)
- White-breasted guinea fowl (Agelastes meleagrides)

Guinea fowl may also refer to:

- Arothron meleagris, the guinea fowl pufferfish
- Hamanumida daedalus, the guinea fowl butterfly
