= Chigi =

Chigi may refer to:

== People ==
=== Surname ===
- House of Chigi, a Roman princely family
  - Mariano Chigi (1439-1504), Sienese banker, founder of the Chigi family branch of Rome
  - Francesco Chigi (1881–1953), Italian nobleman and naturalist

== Architecture ==
- Palazzo Chigi, palace and former noble residence of Chigi family in Rome which is the seat of the Council of Ministers and the official residence of the Prime Minister of Italy.
- Palazzo Chigi of Ariccia, palace of Chigi family in Ariccia
- Palazzo Chigi-Saracini, palace of Chigi family in Siena

=== Other meaning in architecture ===
- Chigi (architecture), an element in Japanese architecture

== Other uses ==
- Chigi (dog), a crossbreed between a Welsh Corgi and a chihuahua (dog)

== See also ==
- Palazzo Chigi (disambiguation)
