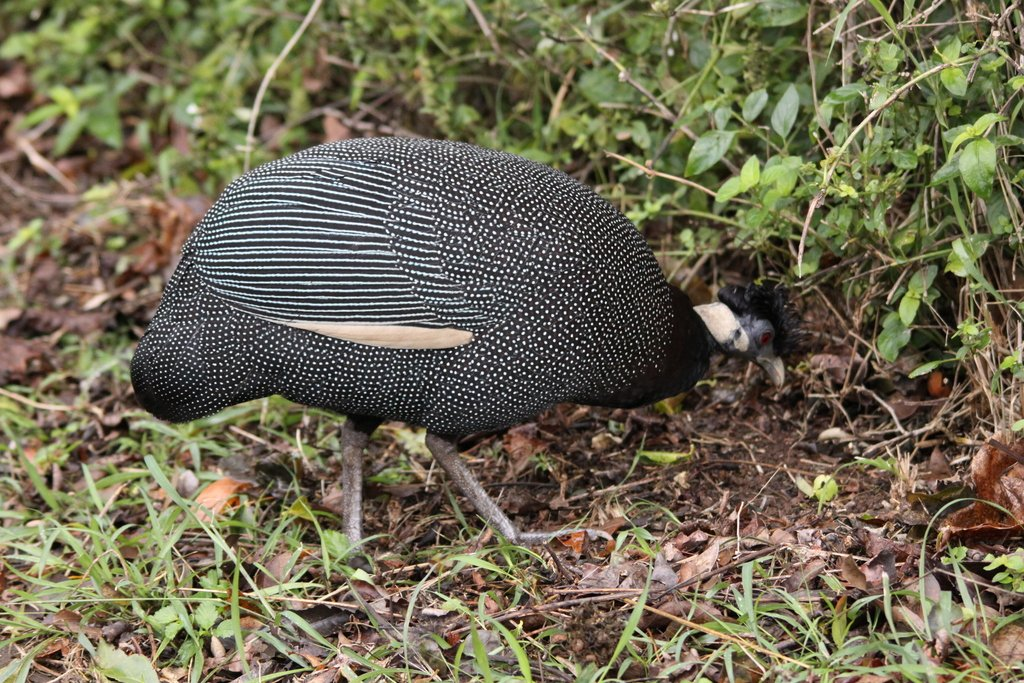

Conservation status
- Least Concern (IUCN 3.1)

Scientific classification
- Kingdom: Animalia
- Phylum: Chordata
- Class: Aves
- Order: Galliformes
- Family: Numididae
- Genus: Guttera
- Species: G. edouardi

Binomial name
- Guttera edouardi (Hartlaub, 1867)

Synonyms
- Guttera cristata

= Southern crested guinea fowl =

Species of bird

The southern crested guinea fowl (Guttera edouardi) is a species of guinea fowl native to sub-Saharan Africa. It can be found from Tanzania to South Africa, where it inhabits open forest, woodland and forest-savanna mosaics. It is one of three species that were formerly considered to be one and the same species, the crested guinea fowl.

== Taxonomy ==
The southern crested guinea fowl has two accepted subspecies:

- G. e. edouardi (Hartlaub, 1867) - Edward's crested guinea fowl – eastern Zambia to Mozambique and eastern South Africa
- G. e. barbata (Ghigi, 1905) – Malawi crested guinea fowl – southeastern Tanzania to eastern Mozambique and Malawi

The intraspecific taxonomy of the crested guinea fowl has been subject to considerable debate, but most recent authorities (such as I. Martinez in Handbook of the Birds of the World) accept five subspecies across three different species. In 2022, Clements and the IUCN split the species into three, with the southern crested guinea fowl comprising the subspecies edouardi and barbara. The nominate subspecies pucherani was designated as the eastern crested guinea fowl, and sclateri and verreauxi as the western crested guinea fowl. In 2023, the IOC World Bird List followed suit.

== Description ==
The three species of crested guinea fowl have a total length of around 50 cm (20 in) and weigh 721–1,543 g (1.590–3.402 lb). The plumage is overall blackish with dense white spots. They have distinctive black crests on the top of their heads, the form of which varies from small curly feathers to down depending on the species, and which easily separates them from other species of guinea fowl, except the plumed guinea fowl. The names "crested" and "plumed" are often misapplied across the species.

== Breeding ==
They are monogamous with probable strong and long-lasting pair bonds. Courtship feeding is common, and the male may run several metres to the hen to present some particular morsel. The nest is a well-hidden scrape in long grass or under a bush; eggs vary from nearly white to buff and a clutch is usually around four or five.
