= Ettore Arrigoni degli Oddi =

Italian ornithologist

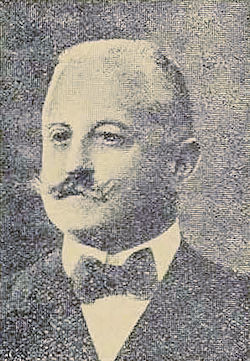
Portrait, c. 1919

Count Ettore Arrigoni degli Oddi MBOU (13 October 1867 – 16 February 1942), was an Italian ornithologist.

In 1896 he was elected a member of the British Ornithologists' Union. Ettore Arrigoni degli Oddi was also a "Tring" correspondent.

In 1911 he founded the Rivista Italiana di Ornitologia, (RIO) a scientific journal on ornithology, together with Filippo Cavazza (1886–1953), Francesco Chigi (1881–1953), Alessandro Ghigi (1875–1970), Giacinto Martorelli (1855–1917) and Tommaso Salvadori (1835–1923). The journal still exists today.

== Publications ==
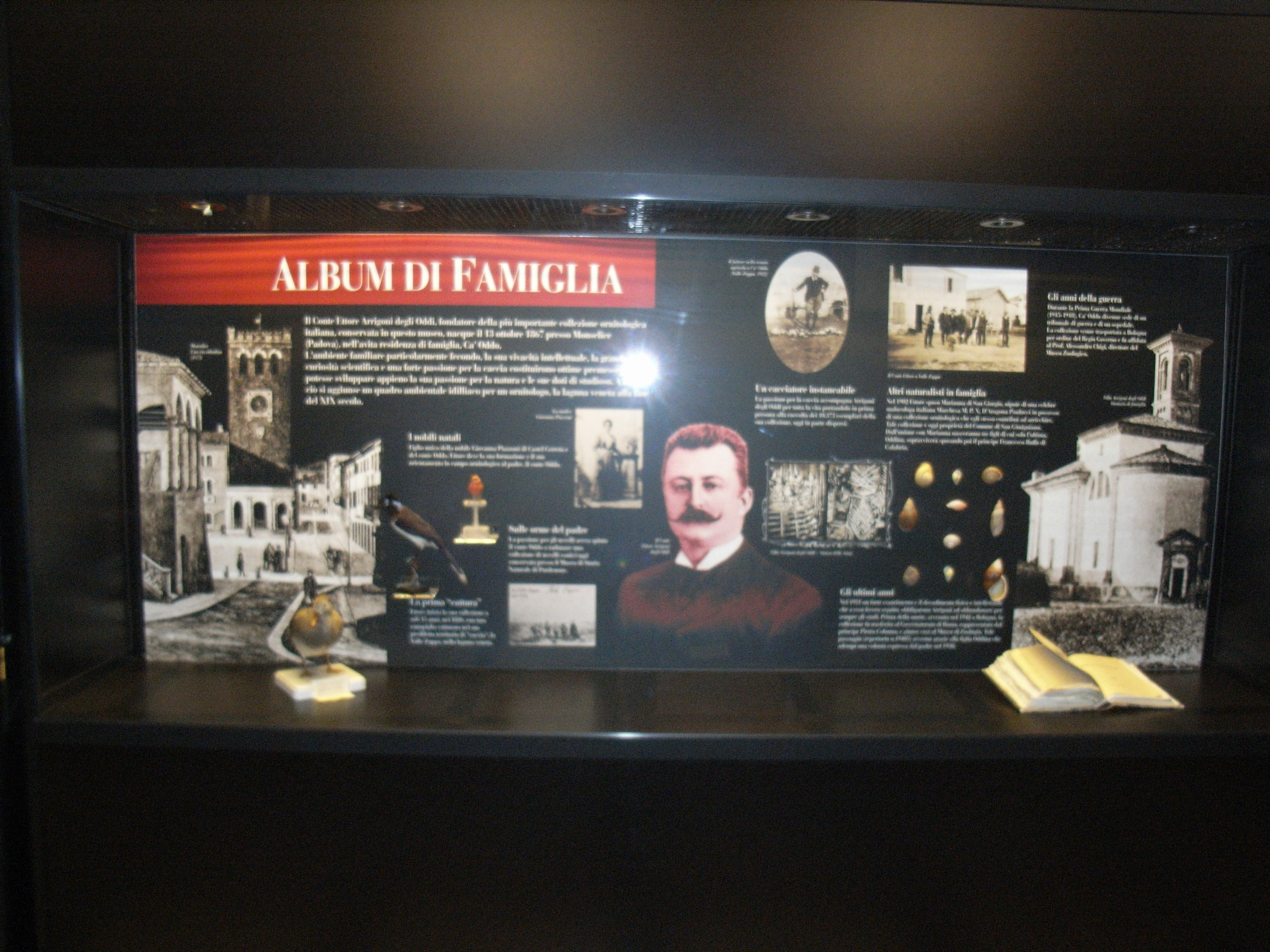
Display Case in Museo Civico di Zoologia

In 1898 his first article in an English journal was published: 'Notes on some specimens of Anatidae in the late Count Ninni's collection,' in The Ibis.

In 1926 following the introduction of a national game law in for Italy in 1923 Oddi wrote a report on bird protection. He is best known as the author of Ornitologia Italiana, con 586 figure intercalate nel testo e 36 tavole colorate. Ulrico Hoepli editore libraio della real casa. Milano. 1929. pp. i-cli•-1-1046, pll. I-XXXVI. 1200 pages giving accounts of the 518 bird species and subspecies then recorded in Italy. The scientific nomenclature was up to date and vernacular names in Italian, French, German and English are provided for each species. A large number of local names was added for the common birds. There is a detailed and differential description of each species, and notes on distribution, breeding, eggs, habitat, song, and food. There are diagnoses of genera and a bibliography of nearly 1000 titles (articles and books on Italian ornithology; general accounts of the structure of birds, bird migration, song, eggs, nidification and taxonomy. There is also a systematic list, a list of species erroneously recorded species and a table of migration dates. The 500 text figures illustrate morphological detail and the 36 coloured plates depict most of the Italian species.

Partial bibliography

- 1885 – Catalogo della raccolta ornitologica Arrigoni Degli Oddi. Stabilimento Prosperini, Padova, 33 pp.
- 1886 – Interessanti osservazioni ornitologiche. Boll. del Naturalista, 6 (11): 146.
- 1886 – Osservazioni sul Germano reale. Boll. del Naturalista, 6 (11): 146-147.
- 1887 – Passo straordinario di uccelli. Boll. del Naturalista, 7 (4): 60-61.
- 1889 – Notizie su alcune catture di uccelli nel 1888. Riv. ital. di Sc. Nat. e Boll. del Naturalista, 9 (8-9): 1-4 (estratto).
- 1892 – La Branta leucopsis nel Veneto. Atti Soc. ital. Sc. Nat., 34 (1): 177-181.
- 1893 – Un ibrido naturale di Anas boscas, Linnaeus e Mareca penelope (Linnaeus) preso nel Veneto. Atti della Società Veneto - Trentina di Scienze Naturali ser. II 1(2): 1-12 (estratto).
- 1894 – Note ornitologiche.- Boll. del Naturalista, 14: 1-2 (estratto).
- 1896 – Le ultime apparizioni dell'Actochelidon sandvicensis (Latham) nel Veneziano. Atti Soc. ital. Sci. Nat., 36: 1-16 (estratto).
- 1896 – Note ornitologiche. Boll. del Naturalista, 16: 1-3 (estratto).
- 1897 – Note ornitologiche per l'anno 1895. Atti della Soc. ital. di Scienze Naturali, 36: 1-8 (estratto)
- 1897 – La recente cattura di un Fenicottero nel Veneziano. Atti della Società italiana di Scienze Naturali, 36: 1-3 (estratto)
- 1898 – Le recenti comparse del Puffinus kuhli (Boie) nel veneziano. Atti Soc. ital. Sci. Nat., 37: 1-5 (estratto).
- "Notes on some specimens of Anatidae in the late Count Ninni's collection". The Ibis. 7. 4: 67–74. January 1898b.
- 1899 Elenco degli Uccelli rari o piti difficili ad aversi conservati nella sua Collezione Ornitologica Italiana al 31 Dicembre, 1898. Pel Prof. Ettore Arrigoni degli Oddi. Ornis, ix. p. 199. [4500 specimens - 179 species enumerated]
- 1900 – Il Budytes citreulus (Pallas) in Italia. Avicula, 4(31-32): 1-2 (estratto).
- 1900 – On the occurrence of Nordmann's Pratincole (Glareola melanoptera) in Italy.The Ibis (gennaio 1900): 60–62.
- Atlante ornitologico : uccelli europei : con notizie d'indole generale e particolare (in Italian). Milano: Ulrico Hoepli. 1902. OCLC 469662742.
- Manuale di Ornitologia italiana. Elenco descrittivo degli uccelli stazionari o di passaggio finora osservati in Italia (in Italian). Milano: Ulrico Hoepli. 1904. OCLC 182908855.
- 1908 – Le comparse del Pastor roseus nel Veneto nella primavera del 1908. Avicula, 12: 57–58.
- 1911 – Il passo nelle valli dell' Estuario Veneto. Riv. ital. Orn., 1: 166–169.
- 1912 – with Damiani G. Note sopra una raccolta di Uccelli dell'Arcipelago Toscano. Riv. ital. Orn. 1 (I s.): 241–261.
- 1913 – L'Oca collo rosso nel Veneziano. Riv. ital. Orn., 2: 119.
- 1913 – Comparsa di Edredoni. Riv. ital. Orn., 2: 119.
- 1914 – Notizie sulle recenti comparse del Beccofrusone (Ampelis garrulus L.). Riv. ital. Orn., 3: 64–70.
- 1914 – Sul passo degli uccelli nell'autunno 1913. Riv. ital. Orn., 3: 71–79.
- 1914 – Gabbiani inanellati. Riv. ital. Orn., 3: 85.
- 1919 – Note ornitologiche (1917–18). Riv. ital. Orn., 5: 120–123.
- 1924 – Nota sopra un ibrido di Quattr'occhi e di Pesciaiola ucciso nel Veneto. Riv. ital. Orn., 6: 33–34.
- 1925 – Notizie sulla recente comparsa di Beccofrusoni (Ampelis garrulus). Riv. ital. Orn., 7: 22–23.
- Ornitologia italiana (in Italian). Milano: Ulrico Hoepli. 1929. OCLC 19348918.
- 1931 – Sopra una Cincia ibrida trovata in Italia. Riv. ital. Orn., 1: 1–4.
- 1931 – Sopra gli Uccelli "Inanellati". Riv. ital. Orn., 1: 18–30.
- 1931 – Notizie ed elenco delle catture di uccelli rari o interessanti avvenute in Italia dopo la pubblicazione della mia "Ornitologia Italiana" (1929) o non registrate nella stessa. Riv. ital. Orn., 1: 66–73.

== Collections ==
Oddi's collection and library are in Museo Civico di Zoologia in Rome where a public gallery is devoted to part his bird collection .

== Other ==
Oddi was on the Executive Committee of the International Ornithological Congress in Amsterdam in 1930.
