= Gobandawu Festival =

Harvest festival celebrated in the Northern Region of Ghana

Gobandawu (Yam) Festival is an annual harvest festival celebrated by the chiefs and people of all traditional areas in the Northern Region of Ghana.

== Celebrations ==
During the festival, yams and guinea fowls are used as sacrificial offering to in laws.

== Significance ==
This festival is celebrated to give thanks to the gods for a bumper harvest.
