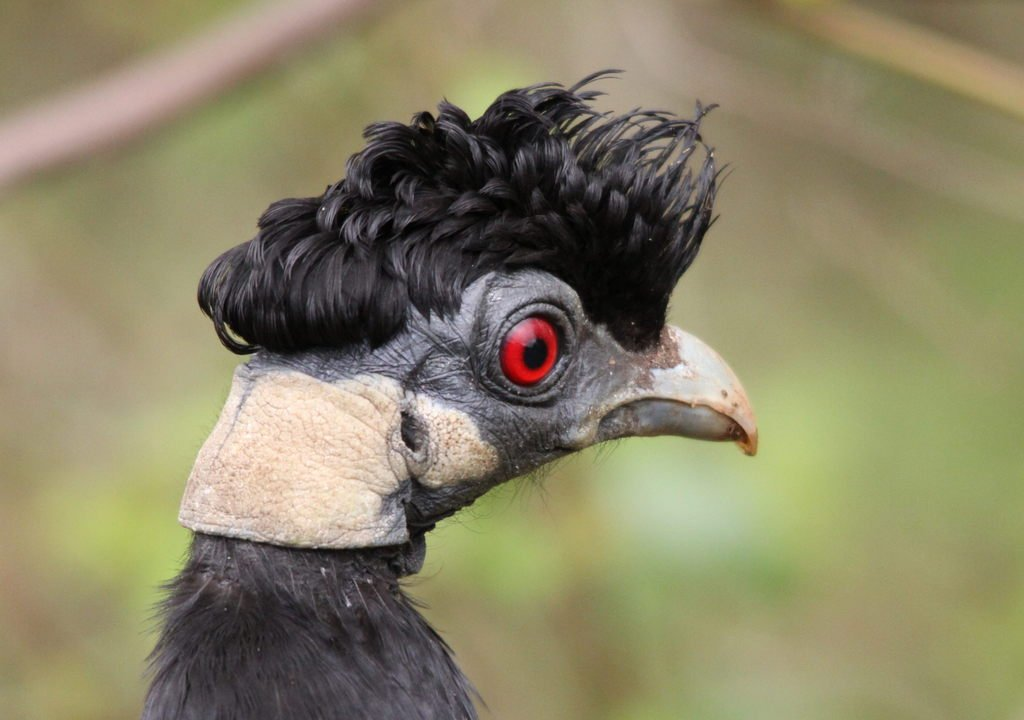

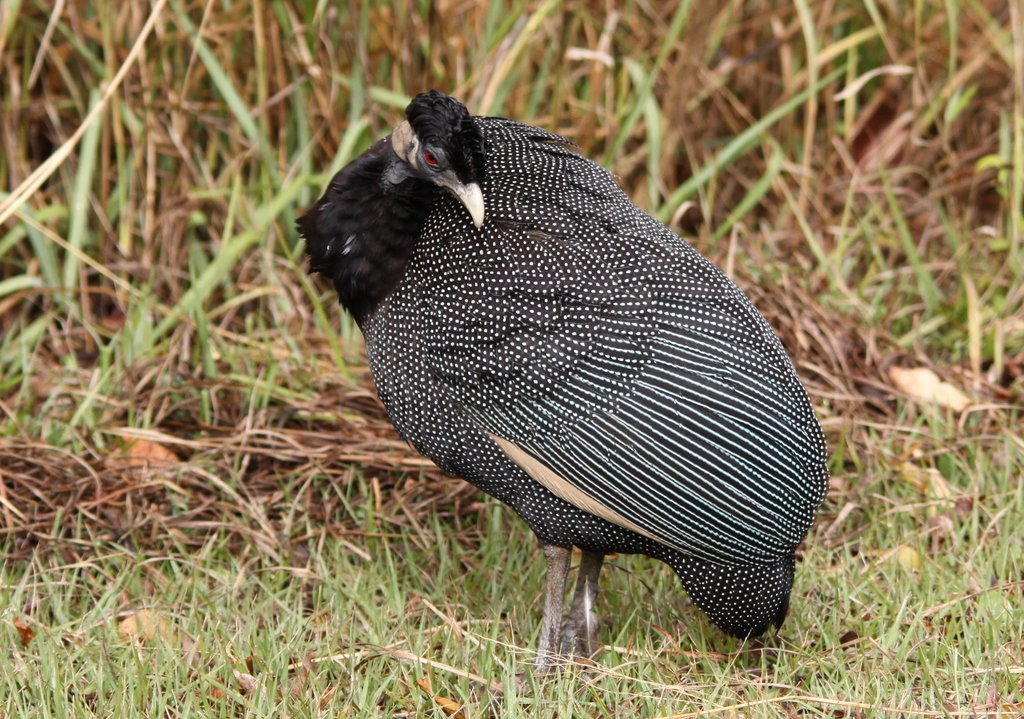
- G. p. edouardi in Hluhluwe–iMfolozi Park, South Africa

Scientific classification
- Kingdom: Animalia
- Phylum: Chordata
- Class: Aves
- Order: Galliformes
- Family: Numididae
- Genus: Guttera

Groups included
- Guttera edouardi; Guttera pucherani; Guttera verreauxi

Cladistically included but traditionally excluded taxa
- Guttera plumifera

= Crested guinea fowl =

Species of bird

The crested guinea fowl (Guttera sp.) are a group of three species and members of the Numididae, the guinea fowl bird family. They are found in open forest, woodland and forest-savanna mosaics in sub-Saharan Africa.

== Description ==
They have a total length around 50 cm (20 in) and weigh 721–1,543 g (1.590–3.402 lb). The plumage is overall blackish with dense white spots. They have distinctive black crests on the top of their heads, the form of which varies from small curly feathers to down depending upon subspecies, and which easily separates them from all other species of guinea fowl, except the plumed guinea fowl. The names "crested" and "plumed" are often misapplied across the species.

== Breeding ==
They are monogamous with probable strong and long-lasting pair bonds. Courtship feeding is common, and the male may run several metres to the hen to present some particular morsel. The nest is a well-hidden scrape in long grass or under a bush; eggs vary from nearly white to buff and a clutch is usually around four or five.

== Intraspecific taxonomy ==
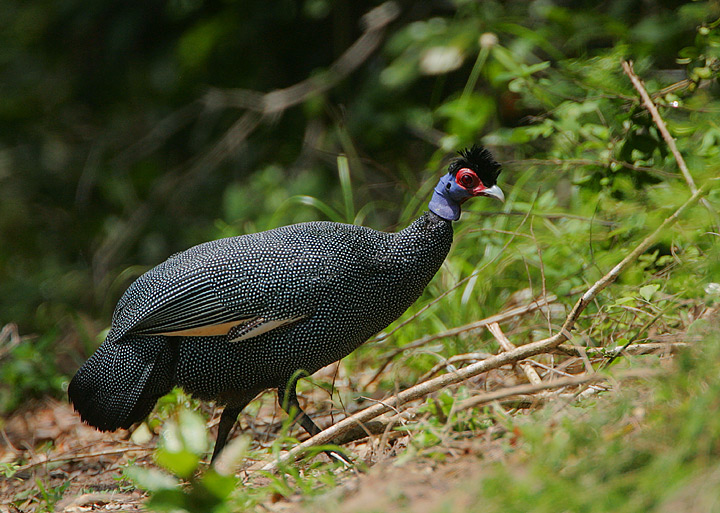
G. p. pucherani in Arabuko Sokoke N.P., eastern Kenya

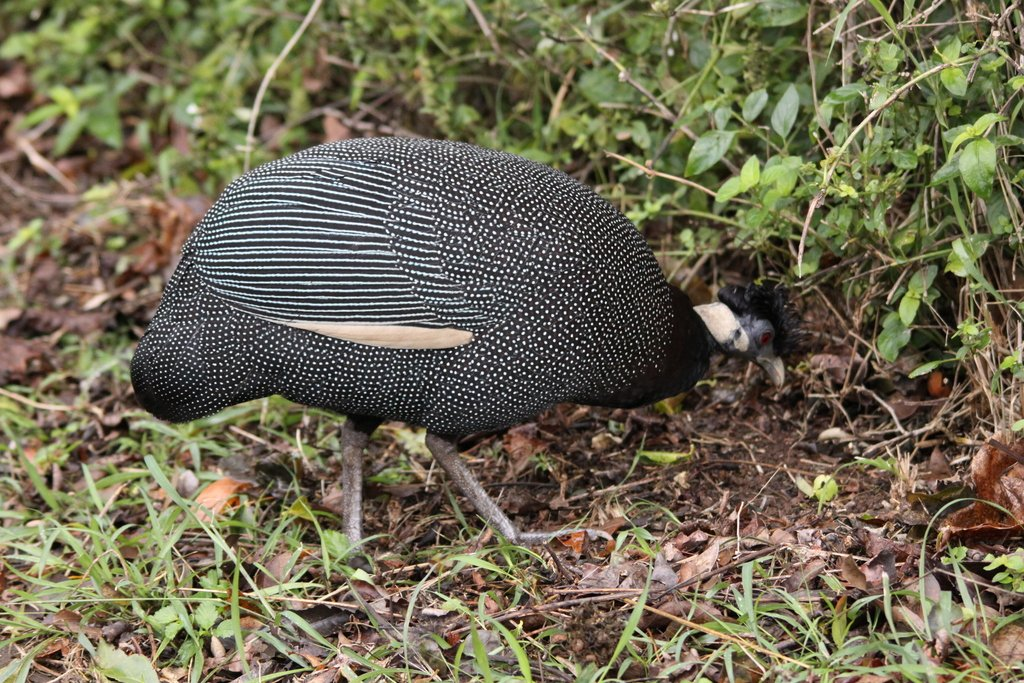
G. p. edouardi in Hluhluwe–iMfolozi Park, eastern South Africa

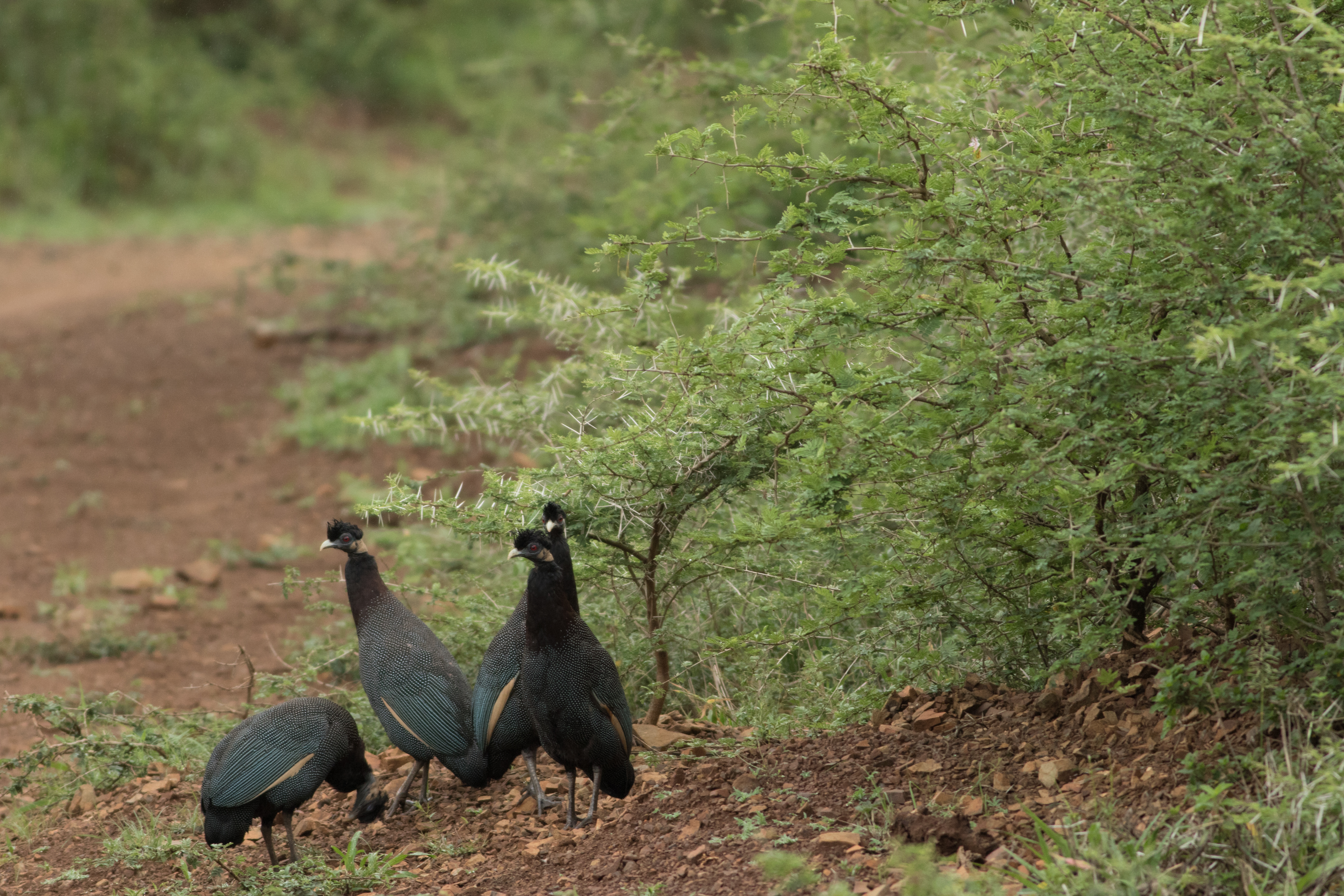
G. p. edouardi in Somkhanda Game Reserve, eastern South Africa

The intraspecific taxonomy of the crested guinea fowl has been subject to considerable debate, but most recent authorities accept five subspecies across three species. (e.g. I. Martinez in Handbook of the Birds of the World [HBW], 1994). Visual differences between the subspecies, in addition to the form of the crest, are in the colour and position of any patches on the otherwise grey-blue neck and face. Such patches vary from almost white to yellow, to red. The pucherani species is found in East Africa from Somalia to Tanzania, and is distinctive with a grey-blue neck and extensive red to the face. The southern crested guinea fowl, in which case the remaining subspecies, which are found in southern, central, and west Africa under the scientific name Guttera edouardi. They have a bluish face and neck, though the nape is very pale greyish (almost white) in some subspecies and the throat is red in others. In 2022, Clements and the IUCN have split the species into three, with the nominate being called eastern crested guinea fowl, subspecies sclateri and verreauxi being called western crested guinea fowl, and edouardi and Barbara being called southern crested guinea fowl. In 2023, the IOCfollowed suit.

== Subspecies ==
The recognized subspecies are:

- Southern crested guinea fowl, Guttera edouardi
  - G. e. edouardi barbata (Ghigi, 1905) – Malawi crested guinea fowl – southeastern Tanzania to eastern Mozambique and Malawi
  - G. e.. edouardi (Hartlaub, 1867) - Edward's crested guinea fowl – eastern Zambia to Mozambique and eastern South Africa
- Eastern crested guinea fowl, Guttera pucherani
  - G. p. pucherani (Hartlaub, 1861) – Kenya crested guinea fowl – Somalia to Tanzania, Zanzibar, and Tumbatu Island
- Western crested guinea fowl, Guttera verreauxi
  - G. v. sclateri (Reichenow, 1898) – Sclater's crested guinea fowl – northwestern Cameroon
  - G. v. verreauxi (Elliot, 1870) – Lindi crested guinea fowl – Guinea-Bissau to western Kenya, Angola, and Zambia
