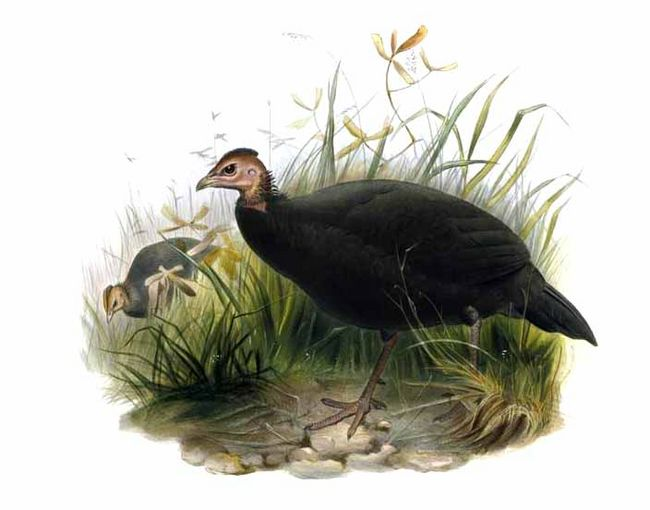

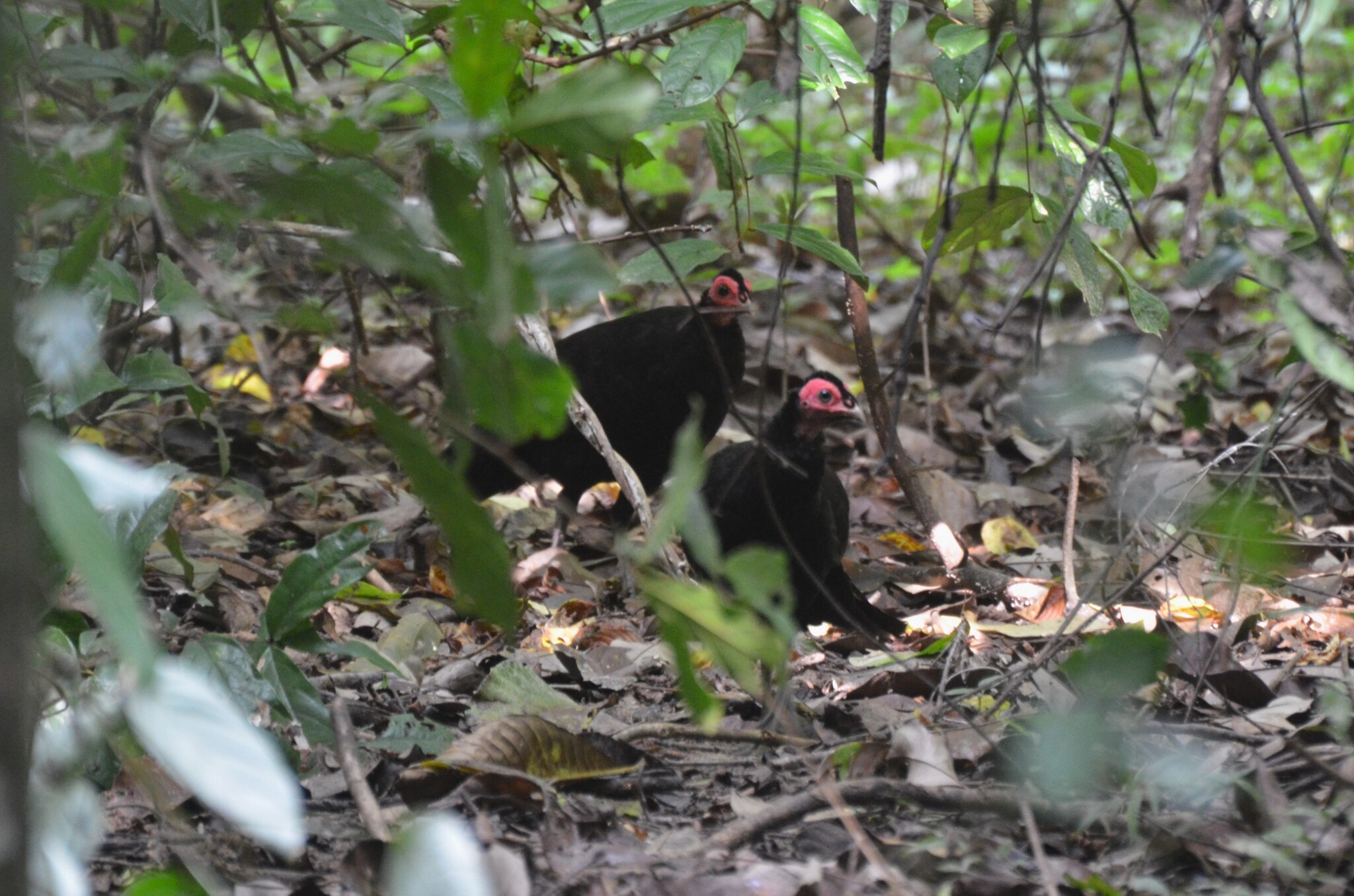
- Agelastes niger flock in Lope, Gabon. Photo by Xavier Rufray for iNaturalist.

Conservation status
- Least Concern (IUCN 3.1)

Scientific classification
- Kingdom: Animalia
- Phylum: Chordata
- Class: Aves
- Order: Galliformes
- Family: Numididae
- Genus: Agelastes
- Species: A. niger

Binomial name
- Agelastes niger (Cassin, 1857)

= Black guinea fowl =

Species of bird

The black guinea fowl (Agelastes niger) is a terrestrial bird of the Numididae (guinea fowl) family found in humid forests in West-Central Africa. It is a medium-sized, black galliforme bird with a bare, orange-pink head and upper neck. As it inhabits dense, potentially inaccessible, regions of equatorial African jungle, little is known of black guinea fowl behaviour or habits. By all accounts, it is a more reclusive, secretive bird when compared to the other, more sociable guinea fowl species; i.e., researchers have been able to successfully observe and document far more information on the confident, gregarious and open grassland-dwelling helmeted guinea fowl (Numidia meleagris), or even the more exotic vulturine guinea fowl (Acryllium vulturinum). Compared to the black guinea fowl, the aforementioned species (and most guinea fowl) tend to be found in more exposed, dry savanna and arid open forest habitat, and congregate in larger communal flocks. Black guinea fowl are seemingly very wary birds, living in smaller social groups than other guinea fowl, and are constantly looking for signs of danger—the slightest hint of which will send the group darting into the bush to hide.

== Description ==
The head and upper neck of an adult black guinea fowl are unfeathered, revealing the pink skin. A crest of short downy feathers is on the forehead and crown, and the throat and lower neck have a scattering of downy feathers. The body and tail feathers are black with some paler speckled markings on the belly. Males have one to three spurs on their legs, while females either have none or a single short spur. Juveniles are similar, but have buff tips to the feathers on their upper parts, a speckled breast, and white belly. The beak is greenish grey and the legs greyish brown. Males are usually slightly larger than females and measure about 42 cm (17 in) in length, weighing about 700 g (25 oz). The call is a monotonous high-pitched "kwee" repeated at the rate of two to three notes per second. The alarm call is an even shriller sound repeated more rapidly.

== Behaviour ==
The black guinea fowl has been little studied. It is usually found in pairs or small groups, and is a shy, elusive bird of the forest floor. It occurs in primary and secondary growth woodland, favouring parts with thick undergrowth, but sometimes venturing out onto adjacent cultivated lands. It feeds on invertebrates such as ants, termites, millipedes, and beetles, and also small frogs, seeds, berries, and shoots. The nesting habits of this species are not known, but the eggs are pale reddish-brown, sometimes shaded with yellow or purple. It may breed in the dry season or possibly at any time of year.

== Distribution and habitat ==
The black guinea fowl is native to the western portions of Central Africa (south of the Sahara), from Nigeria and Cameroon in the west, east and southeast through Equatorial Guinea, Gabon, Angola, Central African Republic, Republic of the Congo, and the Democratic Republic of the Congo. The geographical limit of the species' range is estimated to be around 2,180,000 km^{2} (840,000 sq mi). The birds are terrestrial, however they can fly short distances. They spend much of their time looking for food on the forest floor, living in primary (old-growth) and secondary tropical rainforest as well as occasionally foraging in cultivated croplands or pastures. Regardless of location, black guinea fowl feel most reassured being in or near-to thick jungle vegetation in order to flee from threats or predators.

== Research ==
Black guinea fowl are resistant to various diseases that affect poultry, including Ehrlichia ruminantium, which causes heartwater, but the mechanism for this resistance is not currently known to researchers. The black guinea fowl's genome includes a toll-like receptor (TLR1) which plays an important role in the bird's immune system. This gene has been studied and includes 2,115 nucleotides, encoding 705 amino acids. TLR1 is associated with infections caused by bacteria in both humans and mice, and this gene is of interest to researchers because genetic variation in it is associated with increased Gram-positive bacterial infections, organ failure, and death.

== Status ==
The black guinea fowl's population is decreasing, mostly due to deforestation and unsustainable levels of sustenance hunting. However, this species is quite common within its range and the IUCN lists it as being of Least Concern in its Red List of Threatened Species, as the rate of decline does not seem to justify the bird being placed in a more vulnerable category.
