= Giacomo Damiani =

Italian ichthyologist and ornithologist

Giacomo Damiani (August 1871, Portoferraio – 1944) was an Italian ichthyologist and ornithologist.

Born into a wealthy family on Elba island, Giacomo Damiani graduated from the University of Genoa and became a teacher of Natural Sciences in secondary schools. By the age of 20, in 1891, he was in contact with Enrico Giglioli, the leading Italian ornithologist of the time, who was based at the museum in Florence. He was instrumental in assembling a zoological collection called “la collezione Elbana” at Villa di San Martino, now dispersed. Many of his specimens are in the La Specola museum in Florence.

== Selected works ==
- 1892 ‘Rondini e Rondoni’ (martins and swifts) Bollettino del Naturalista.
- 1892 ‘Prima contribuzione alla ittiofauna del mare dell’Elba’ Bollettino del Naturalista Marine fish.
- 1892 ‘Note ornitologiche dall’Elba the first of a series of papers with this title published during the next 20 years in the journal Avicula.
- 1909. Su alcuni rari scombridi dell'isola Elba (1898–1908). Bollettino della Società Zoologica Italiana, Roma, ser. 2, 10, p. 106, 112, 113.
- 1911. Sovra una Balaenoptera del novembre 1910 a Marciana Marina (Elba). Bollettino della Società Zoologica Italiana, Roma 1911:50-57.
- 1912 with Conte Arrigoni degli Oddi E. Note sopra una raccolta di Uccelli dell'Arcipelago Toscano. Riv. ital. Orn. 1 (I s.): 241–261. Birds of the Tuscan Archipelago.
