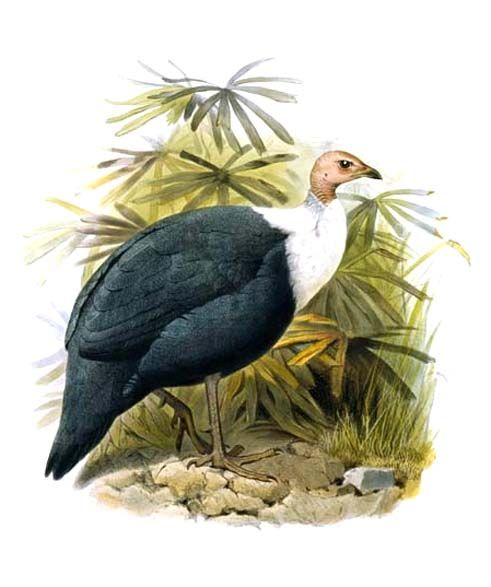
- White-breasted guineafowl, Agelastes meleagrides

Scientific classification
- Kingdom: Animalia
- Phylum: Chordata
- Class: Aves
- Order: Galliformes
- Family: Numididae
- Genus: Agelastes; Bonaparte, 1850

Type species
- Agelastes meleagrides Bonaparte, 1850

Species
- A. meleagrides A. niger

= Agelastes =

Genus of birds

Agelastes is a small genus of birds in the guineafowl family. It comprises two species:

- White-breasted guineafowl, A. meleagrides
- Black guineafowl, A. niger
