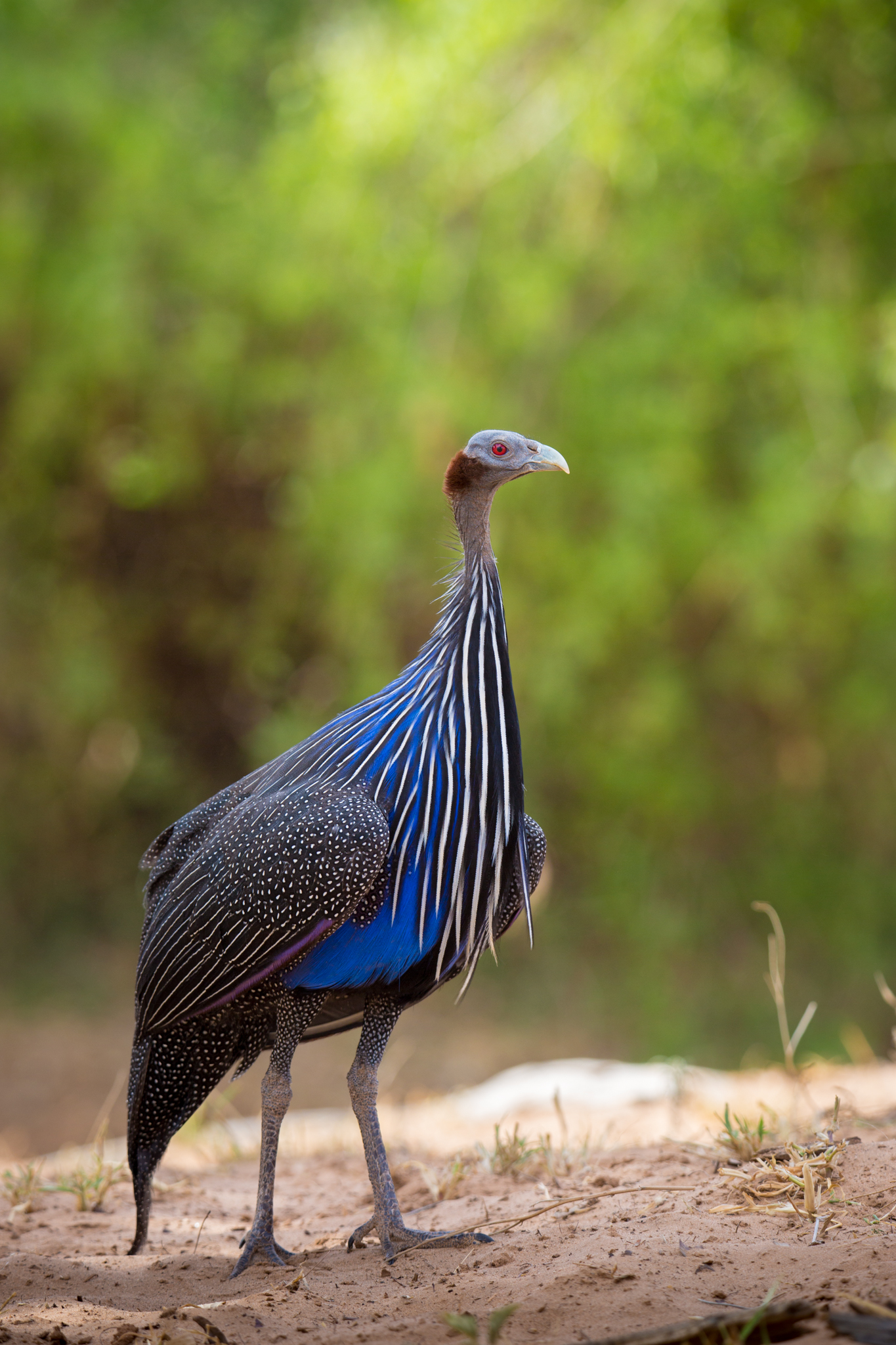
- Individual at Samburu National Reserve

Conservation status
- Least Concern (IUCN 3.1)

Scientific classification
- Kingdom: Animalia
- Phylum: Chordata
- Class: Aves
- Order: Galliformes
- Family: Numididae
- Genus: Acryllium; Gray, GR, 1840
- Species: A. vulturinum

Binomial name
- Acryllium vulturinum (Hardwicke, 1834)

= Vulturine guinea fowl =

Species of bird

The vulturine guinea fowl (Acryllium vulturinum) is the largest extant species of guinea fowl. Systematically, it is only distantly related to other guinea fowl genera. Its closest living relative, the white breasted guinea fowl, Agelastes meleagrides inhabit primary forests in Central Africa. It is a member of the bird family Numididae, and is the only member of the genus Acryllium. It is a resident breeder in northeast Africa, from southern Ethiopia and Somalia through Kenya and just into northern Tanzania.

== Description ==
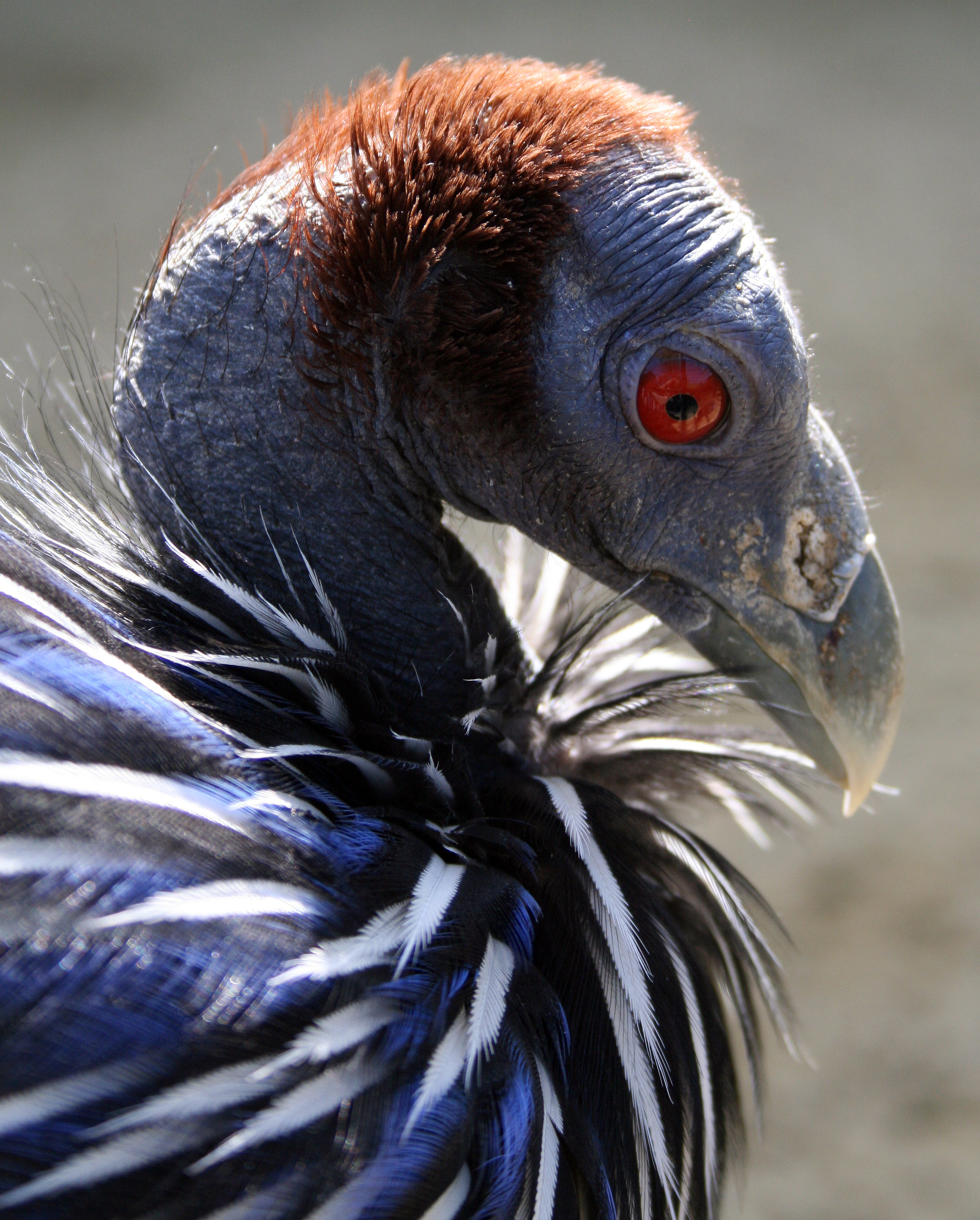
Upper body

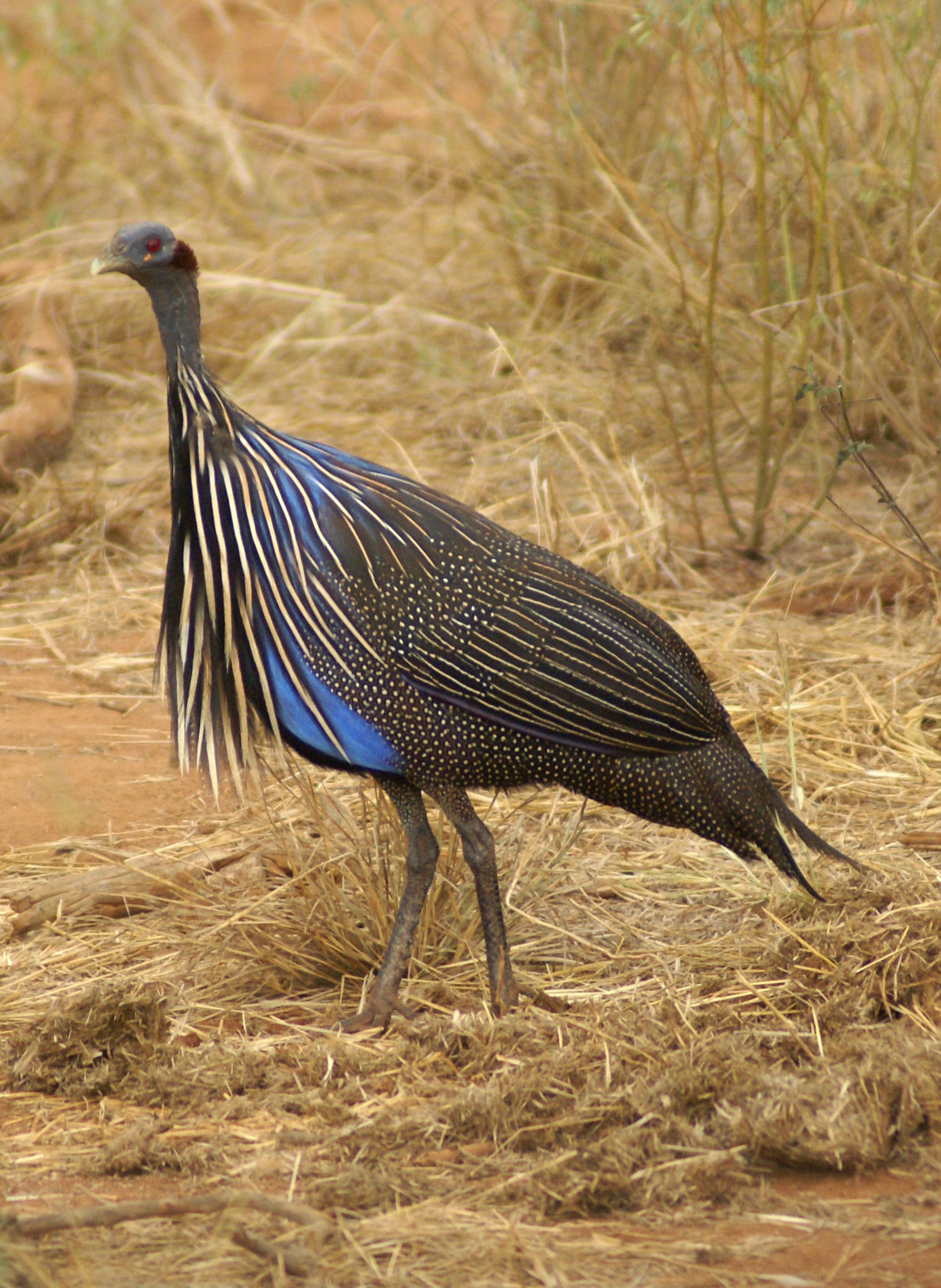
At Tsavo East National Park, Kenya

The vulturine guinea fowl is a large (61–71 centimetres (24–28 in)) bird with a round body and small head. Its average weight is between 1kg to 1.6kg and it has longer wings, neck, legs and tail than other guinea fowl. The adult has a bare blue face and black neck, and although all other guinea fowl have unfeathered heads, this species looks particularly like a vulture because of the long bare neck and head.

The slim neck projects from a cape of long, glossy, blue and white hackles. The breast is cobalt blue, and the rest of the body plumage is black, finely spangled with white. The wings are short and rounded, and the tail is longer than others in the family Numididae.

The sexes are similar, although the female is usually slightly smaller than the male and with smaller tarsal spurs. Young birds are mainly grey-brown, with a duller blue breast and short hackles.

== Behaviour ==
The vulturine guinea fowl is a gregarious species, forming flocks outside the breeding season typically of about 25 birds. This species' food are seeds and small invertebrates. This guinea fowl is terrestrial and will run rather than fly when alarmed. Despite the open habitat, it tends to keep to cover, and roosts in trees. It makes loud chink-chink-chink-chink-chink calls.

It breeds in dry and open habitats with scattered bushes and trees, such as savannah or grassland. It usually lays 4–8 cream-coloured eggs in a well-hidden grass-lined scrape.

== Diet ==
Vulturine guinea fowl eat seeds, roots, tubers, grubs, rodents, small reptiles and insects. They also occasionally eat vegetation and fruits.
