= Palazzo Chigi (disambiguation) =

Palazzo Chigi is a palace which is the seat of the Italian Government.

Palazzo Chigi may also refer to:

- Palazzo Chigi-Odescalchi, in Rome
- Palazzo Chigi, Ariccia
- Palazzo Chigi, Formello

== See also ==
- Chigi family
