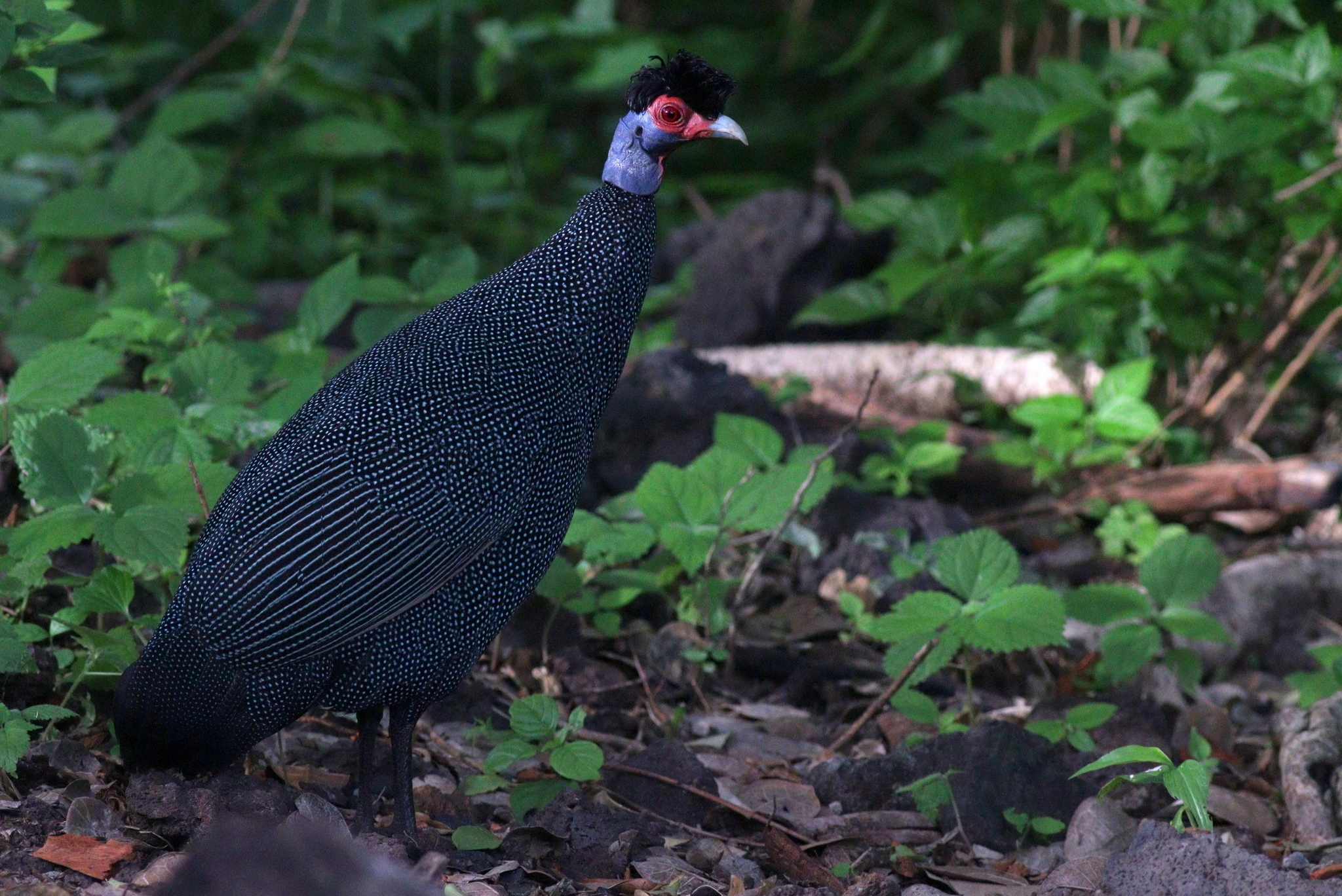
- Eastern crested guineafowl (G. pucherani)

Scientific classification
- Kingdom: Animalia
- Phylum: Chordata
- Class: Aves
- Order: Galliformes
- Family: Numididae
- Genus: Guttera; Wagler, 1832

Type species
- Numida cristata Pallas, 1767

Species
- G. plumifera G. pucherani G. verreauxi G. edouardi

= Guttera =

Genus of birds

Guttera is a genus of birds in the family Numididae. The four species are found in forests of sub-Saharan Africa. Unlike other guineafowl, they have a distinctive black crest.

== Taxonomy ==
Established by Johann Georg Wagler in 1832, it contains four species:

Common name	Species
Plumed guineafowl	Guttera plumifera
Eastern crested guineafowl	Guttera pucherani
Western crested guineafowl	Guttera verreauxi
Southern crested guineafowl	Guttera edouardi

=== Etymology ===
The name Guttera is a combination of the Latin words gutta, meaning "spot" and -fera, meaning "bearing" (from ferre: to bear).
