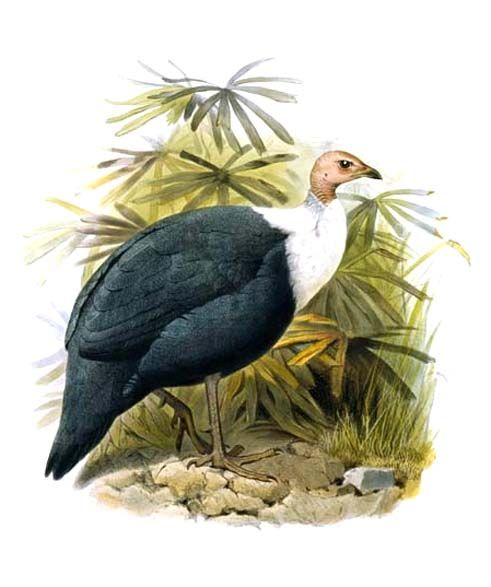

Conservation status
- Vulnerable (IUCN 3.1)

Scientific classification
- Kingdom: Animalia
- Phylum: Chordata
- Class: Aves
- Order: Galliformes
- Family: Numididae
- Genus: Agelastes
- Species: A. meleagrides

Binomial name
- Agelastes meleagrides Bonaparte, 1850

= White-breasted guinea fowl =

Species of bird

The white-breasted guinea fowl (Agelastes meleagrides) is a medium-sized, up to 45 cm long, terrestrial bird of the guinea fowl family.

== Description ==
It has a black plumage with a small, bare, red head, white breast, long, black tail, greenish-brown bill, and greyish feet. The sexes are similar, although the female is slightly smaller than the male.

== Distribution ==
The white-breasted guinea fowl is distributed in subtropical West African forests of Ivory Coast, Ghana, Guinea, Liberia, and Sierra Leone. Although preferring a more dry climate, the species prioritizes forest coverage causing the distribution of the species to have a much broader distribution.

== Diet ==
Its diet consists mainly of seeds, berries, termites, and small animals.

== Conservation ==
Due to ongoing habitat loss and hunting in some areas, the white-breasted guinea fowl is rated as vulnerable on the IUCN Red List.
