= Francesco Chigi =

Francesco Chigi della Rovere (4 April 1881 – 7 July 1953) was an Italian nobleman, photographer, army officer and naturalist. Chigi was involved in establishing the zoo in Rome, conservation of the Italian wildlife, founding the magazine Rassegna faunistica, and the establishment of the Castel Fusano bird observatory in addition to various other state matters.

Chigi was the youngest son of Mario (1832–1914) who was the Marshal of Santa Romana Chiesa, and Antoniette Zu Sayn-Wittgenstein-Berleburg (1839–1918). He was left to manage the Ariccia farm after dropping out of high school. Here he became interested in birds and nature. He became a member of the Società Zoologica Italiana and worked at the Museum of Rome University under Antonio Carruccio, contributing bird specimens and notes. His collection consisted of 1617 mounted birds from Rome and 900 skins from other parts of Europe obtained through exchanges with collectors. His collection included the now extinct slender billed curlew (Numenius tenuirostris). Chigi founded a bird observatory at Castel Fusano and began a magazine, Rassegna faunistica, in which he wrote extensively about birds. Chigi considered the house sparrow as a single species across Italy and did not subscribe to the view of Tommaso Salvadori on the existence of Passer italiae and Passer hispaniolensis. In 1932 Margaret Morse Nice visited Europe and visited Castel Fusano where she saw his bird-banding work. She also noted how they captured birds by whistling and using trammel nets. Nice requested Chigi to write about them and it was published in Bird Banding in 1933.

Chigi had an interest in photography and worked with his own darkroom. He was a member of the Italian Photographic Society. He married Maria Concetta Torlonia in 1919 and they had a daughter Olympia. Chigi was also a keen motor-enthusiast and he sold part of his real estate for purchasing cars and had several accidents driving them. He killed a priest in 1917 with a Ford and in 1923 his wife was killed. In 1924 he married his wife's sister and they had five children.

In 1936 he wrote on the extinction of animals and was involved in measures to conserve wildlife. He was involved in establishing the zoo (Giardino Zoologico) in Rome.

His photography collection was donated by his son Mario to the Gabinetto Fotografico Nazionale in 1979. Although a lot of the material was damaged it included 1300 glass negatives.
