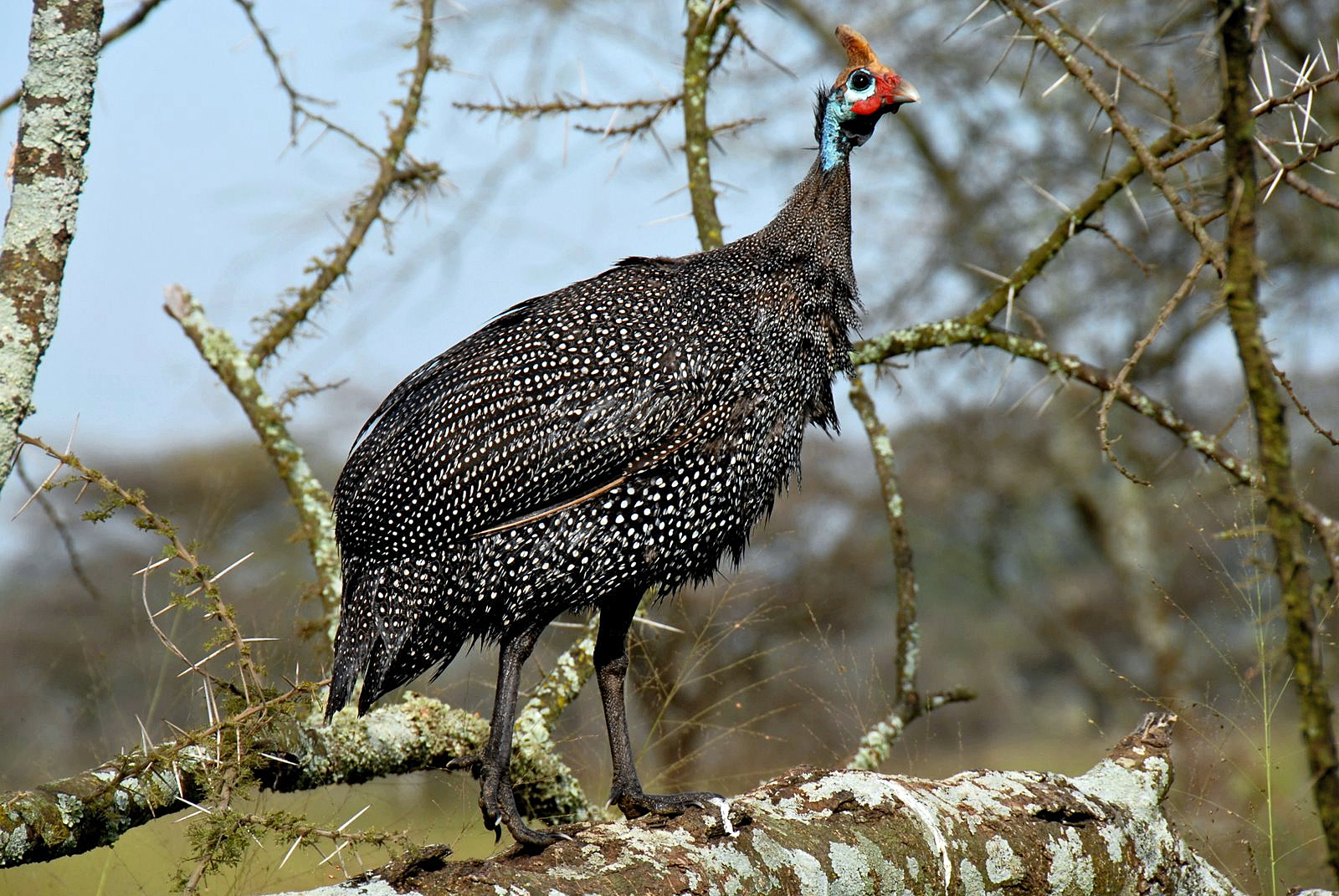
- Helmeted guinea fowl (Numida meleagris)

Scientific classification
- Kingdom: Animalia
- Phylum: Chordata
- Class: Aves
- Order: Galliformes
- Superfamily: Phasianoidea
- Family: Numididae; Longchamps, 1842

Genera
- Acryllium; Agelastes; Guttera; Numida

= Guinea fowl =

Family of birds

Guinea fowl or guineafowl (/ˈɡɪnifaʊl/) are birds of the family Numididae in the order Galliformes. They are endemic to Africa and rank among the oldest of the gallinaceous birds. Phylogenetically, they branched off from the core Galliformes after the Cracidae (chachalacas, guans, and curassows) and before the Odontophoridae (New World quail). An Eocene fossil lineage Telecrex has been associated with guinea fowl; Telecrex inhabited Mongolia, and may have given rise to the oldest of the true phasianids, such as blood pheasants and eared pheasants, which evolved into high-altitude, montane-adapted species with the rise of the Tibetan Plateau. While modern guinea fowl species are endemic to Africa, the helmeted guinea fowl has been introduced as a domesticated bird widely elsewhere.

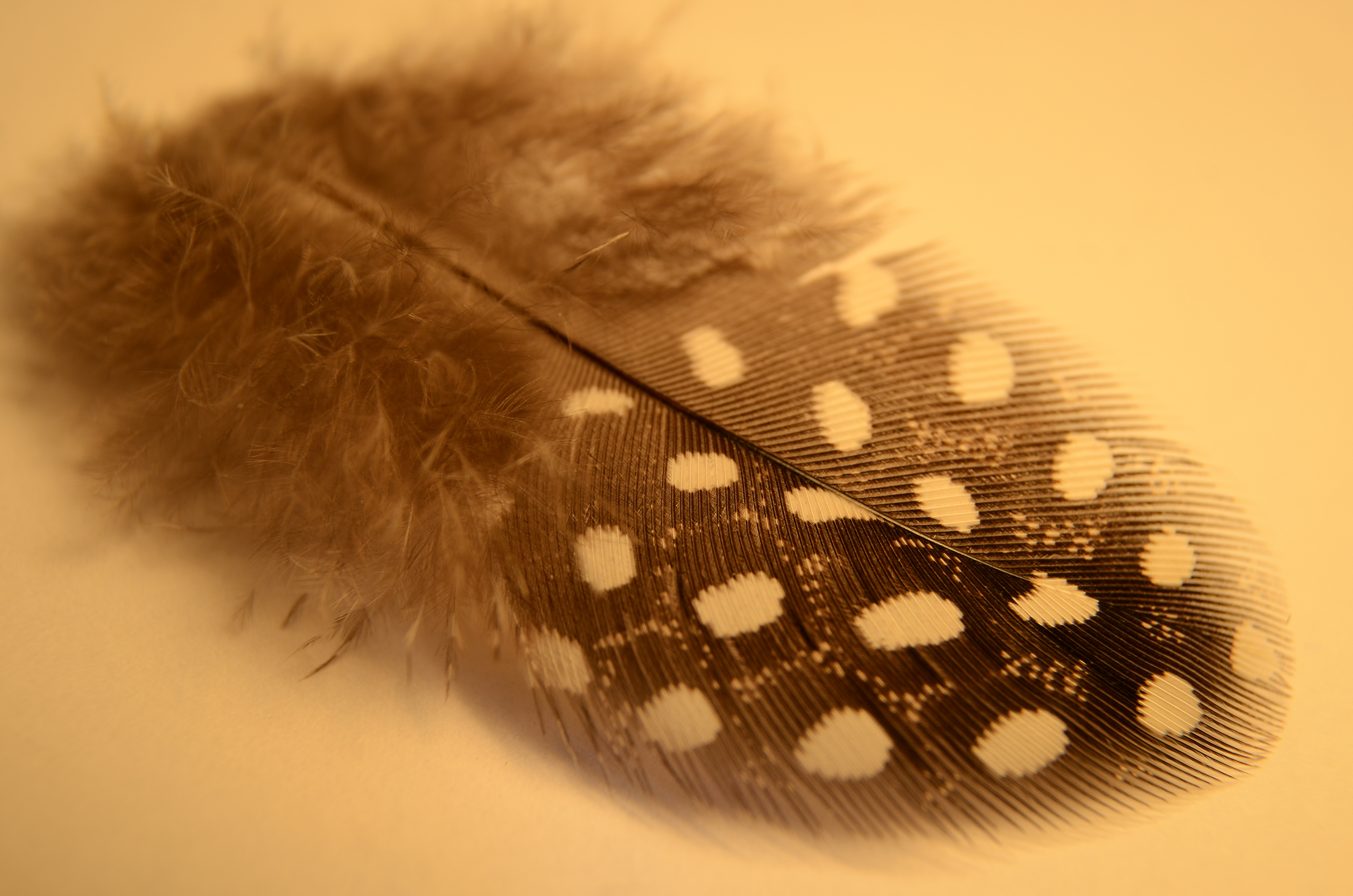
Feather of a guinea fowl

A flock of guinea fowl free-roaming on a ranch in Texas (U.S.)

== Taxonomy and systematics ==
This is a list of guinea fowl species, presented in taxonomic order.

Subfamily	Image	Genus	Living species
Agelastinae		Agelastes Bonaparte, 1850	White-breasted guinea fowl, Agelastes meleagrides; Black guinea fowl, Agelastes niger
Agelastinae		Acryllium G.R. Gray, 1840	Vulturine guinea fowl, Acryllium vulturinum
Numidinae		Numida Linnaeus, 1764	Helmeted guinea fowl, Numida meleagris
Numidinae		Guttera Wagler, 1832	Plumed guinea fowl, Guttera plumifera; Eastern crested guinea fowl, Guttera pucherani; Western crested guinea fowl, Guttera verreauxi; Southern crested guinea fowl, Guttera edouardi

=== Phylogeny ===
Cladogram based on a study by De Chen and collaborators published in 2021.

- Numididae
  - - Numida
    - Agelastes
  - - Guttera
    - Acryllium

== Description ==
The insect- and seed-eating, ground-nesting birds of this family resemble partridges, but with featherless heads, though both members of the genus Guttera have a distinctive black crest, and the vulturine guinea fowl (Acryllium vulturinum) has a downy brown patch on the nape. Most species of guinea fowl have a dark grey or blackish plumage with dense white spots, but both members of the genus Agelastes lack the spots. While several species are relatively well known, the plumed guinea fowl and the two members of the genus Agelastes remain relatively poorly known. These large birds measure 40–71 cm (15 1/2–28 in) in length, and weigh 700–1,600 g (1 lb 9 oz – 3 lb 8 oz). Guinea hens weigh more than guinea cocks, possibly because of the larger reproductive organs in the female compared to the male guinea fowl. Also, the presence of relatively larger egg clusters in the dual-purpose guinea hens may be a factor that contributes to the higher body weight of the guinea hens.

== Behaviour and ecology ==
The species for which information is known are normally monogamous, mating for life, or are serially monogamous; however, occasional exceptions have been recorded for helmeted and Kenya crested guinea fowl, which have been reported to be polygamous in captivity. All guinea fowl are social, and typically live in small groups or large flocks. Though they are monogamous, species of the least-derived genera Guttera, Agelastes, and Acryllium tend toward social polyandry, a trait shared with other primitive galliforms such as roul roul, and Congo peafowl.

Guinea fowl travel behind herd animals and beneath monkey troops, where they forage within manure and on items that have fallen to the understory from the canopy. They play a pivotal role in the control of ticks, flies, locusts, scorpions, and other invertebrates. They pluck maggots from carcasses and manure.

Wild guinea fowl are strong flyers. Their breast muscles are dark (aerobic metabolism), enabling them to sustain themselves in flight for considerable distances if hard-pressed. Grass and bush fires are a constant threat to them and flight is the most effective escape.

Some species of guinea fowl, like the vulturine, may go without drinking water for extended periods, instead sourcing their moisture from their food. Young guinea fowl (called keets) are very sensitive to weather, in particular cold temperatures.

Guinea hens are not known to be good mothers, but in the wild, the guinea hen's mate (a guinea cock) may help tend the young keets during the day by keeping them warm and finding food. Sometimes, more than one cock helps raise the young. Guinea fowl (hens and cocks together) make good parents. During warm weather, the cock is unlikely to sit on the keets during the night (leaving that duty to the hen), but may help the hen keep them warm at night when temperatures drop below freezing.

Guinea fowl may be trained to go into a coop (instead of roosting in trees) when very young. Once hatched and ready to leave the brooder (around three weeks), they may be enclosed in a coop for at least three days so they learn where "home" is. When guinea parents (that already roost in a coop) raise their own keets, the hen sits on them outdoors at night, but then the parents teach the keets to also go into the coop in the evenings around three weeks of age.

Males and females have different calls, which can be used to differentiate between them. Unlike chickens (which generally do best with one rooster for a flock of hens), guinea fowl do well with one cock for each hen.

Guinea fowl have been shown to act as a deterrent to foxes. Due to the spread of Lyme disease from ticks, guinea fowl are often kept because they will eat the ticks.

== Distribution and habitat ==
Guinea fowl species are found across sub-Saharan Africa, some almost in the entire range, others more localized, such as the plumed guinea fowl in west-central Africa and the vulturine guinea fowl in north-east Africa. They live in semiopen habitats such as savanna or semideserts, while some, such as the black guinea fowl, mainly inhabit forests. Some perch high on treetops.

The helmeted guinea fowl has been introduced in East Africa, South America, the West Indies, the United States, Britain, and India, where it is raised as food or pets.

== Guinea fowl as food ==
Guinea fowl meat is moist, firmer and leaner than chicken meat and has a slight gamey flavour. It has marginally more protein than chicken or turkey, roughly half the fat of chicken and slightly less food energy per gram. Their eggs are substantially richer than those of chickens.

== Gallery ==
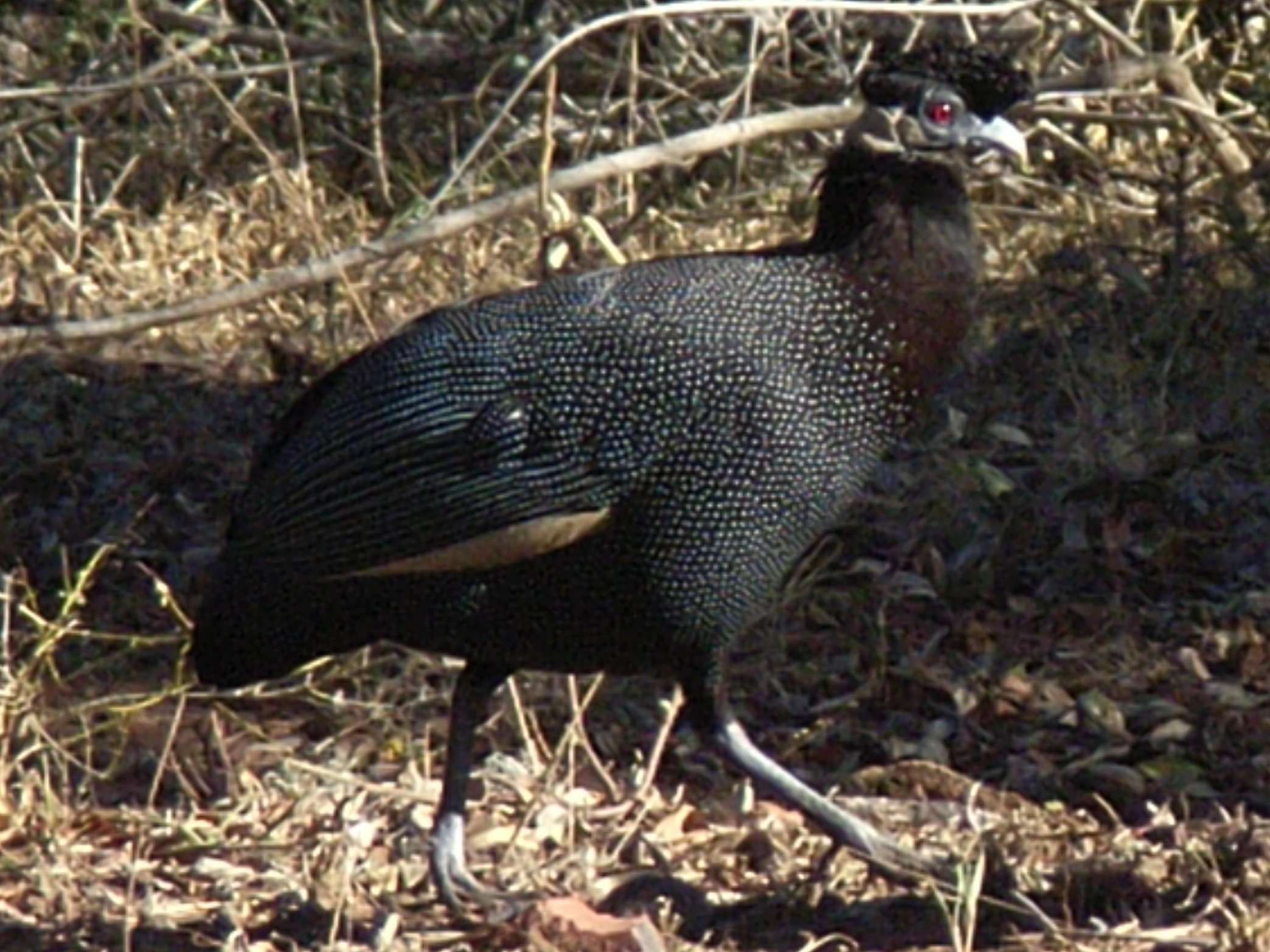
Crested guinea fowl in South Africa

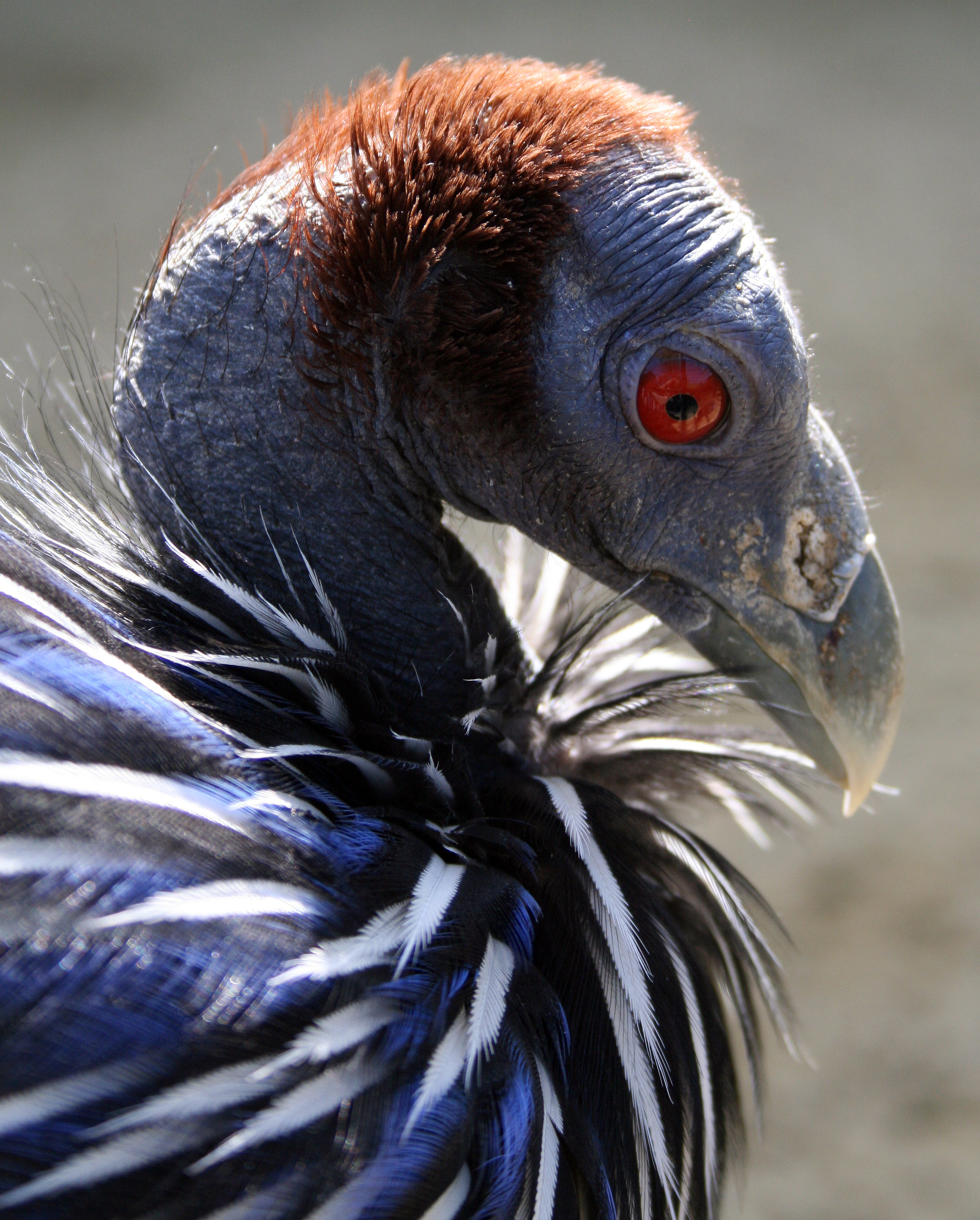
Head of a vulturine guinea fowl

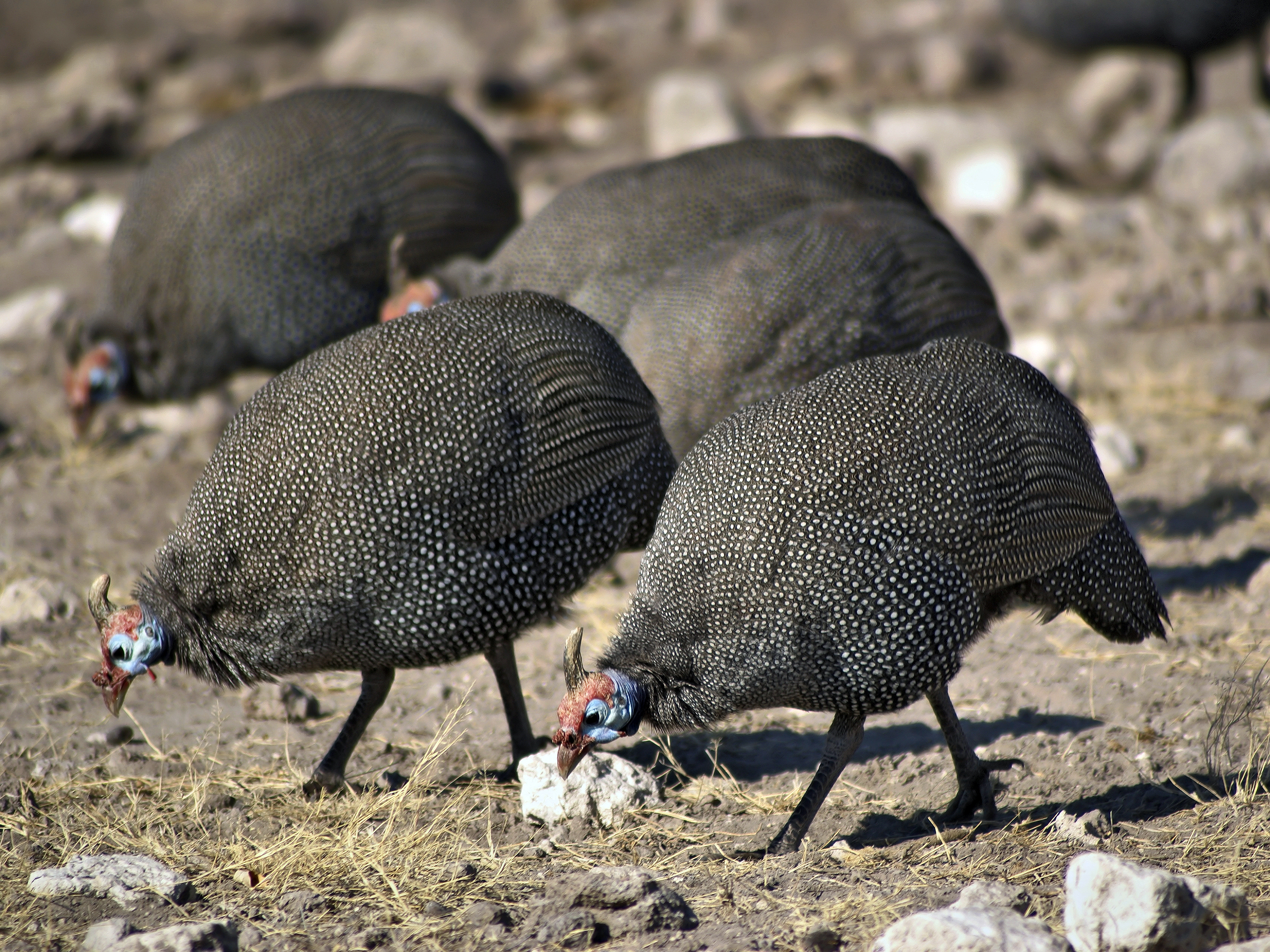
Helmeted guinea fowl in Namibia

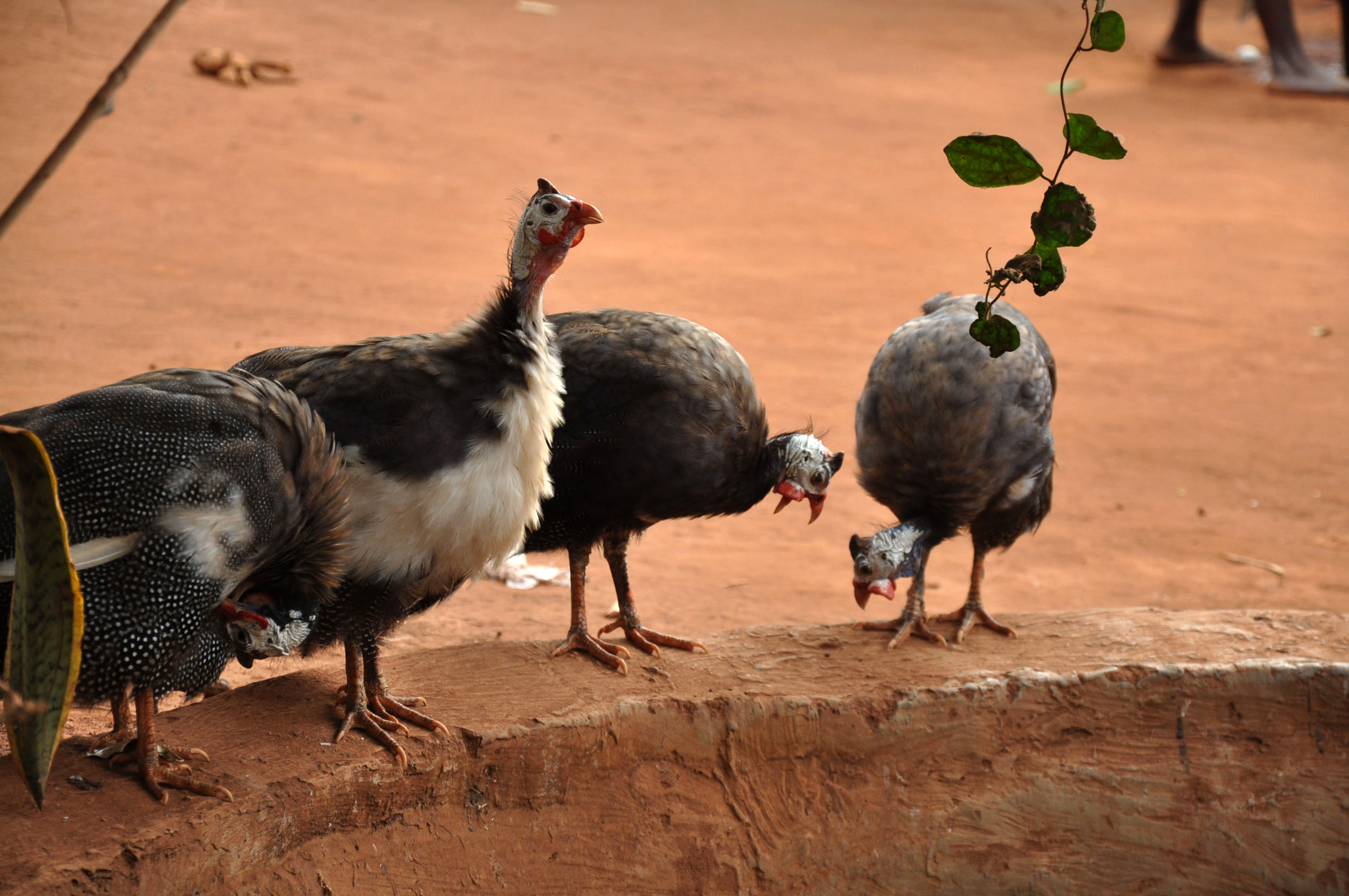
Guinea fowl in Benin

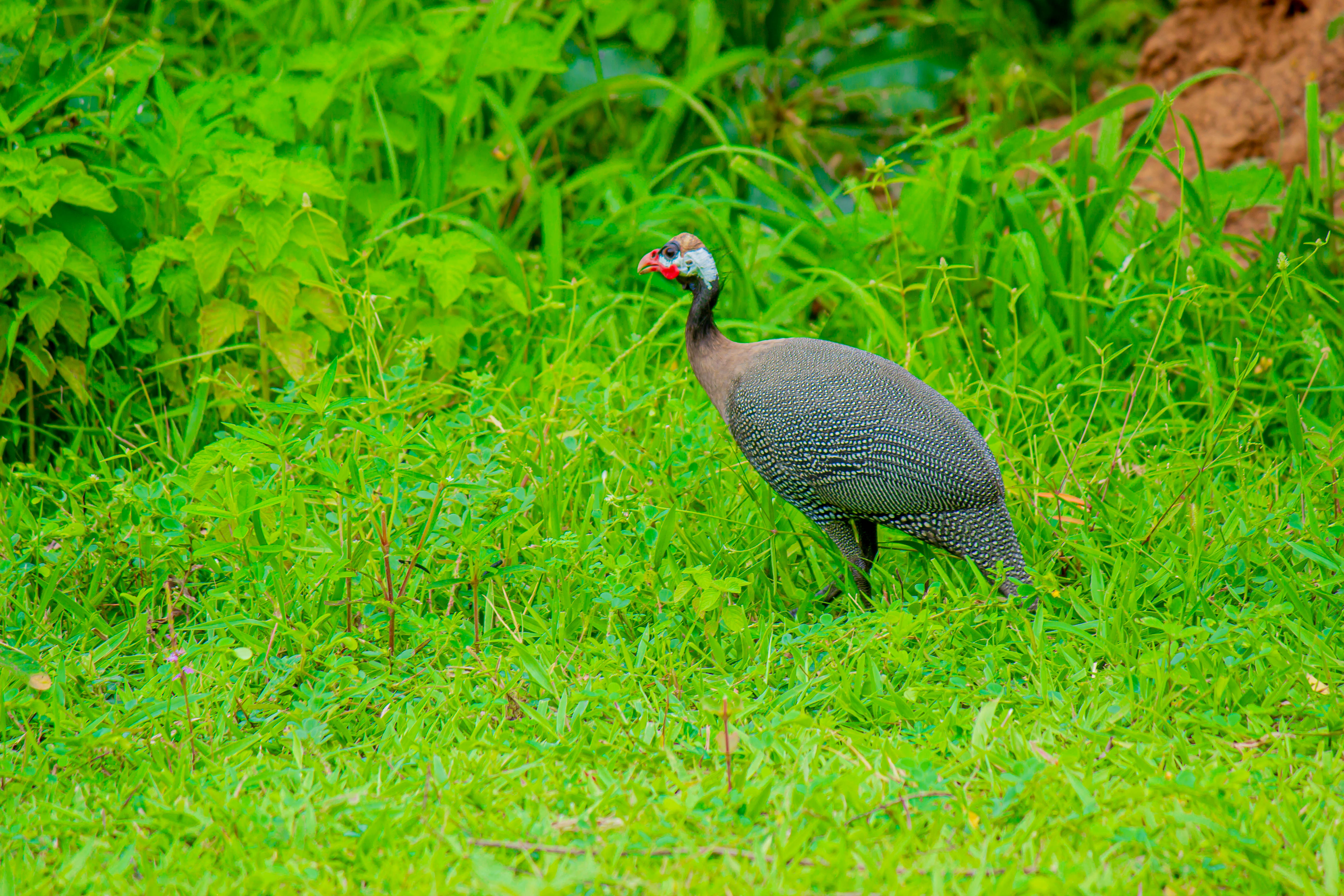
Guinea fowl at Mole National Park in Ghana

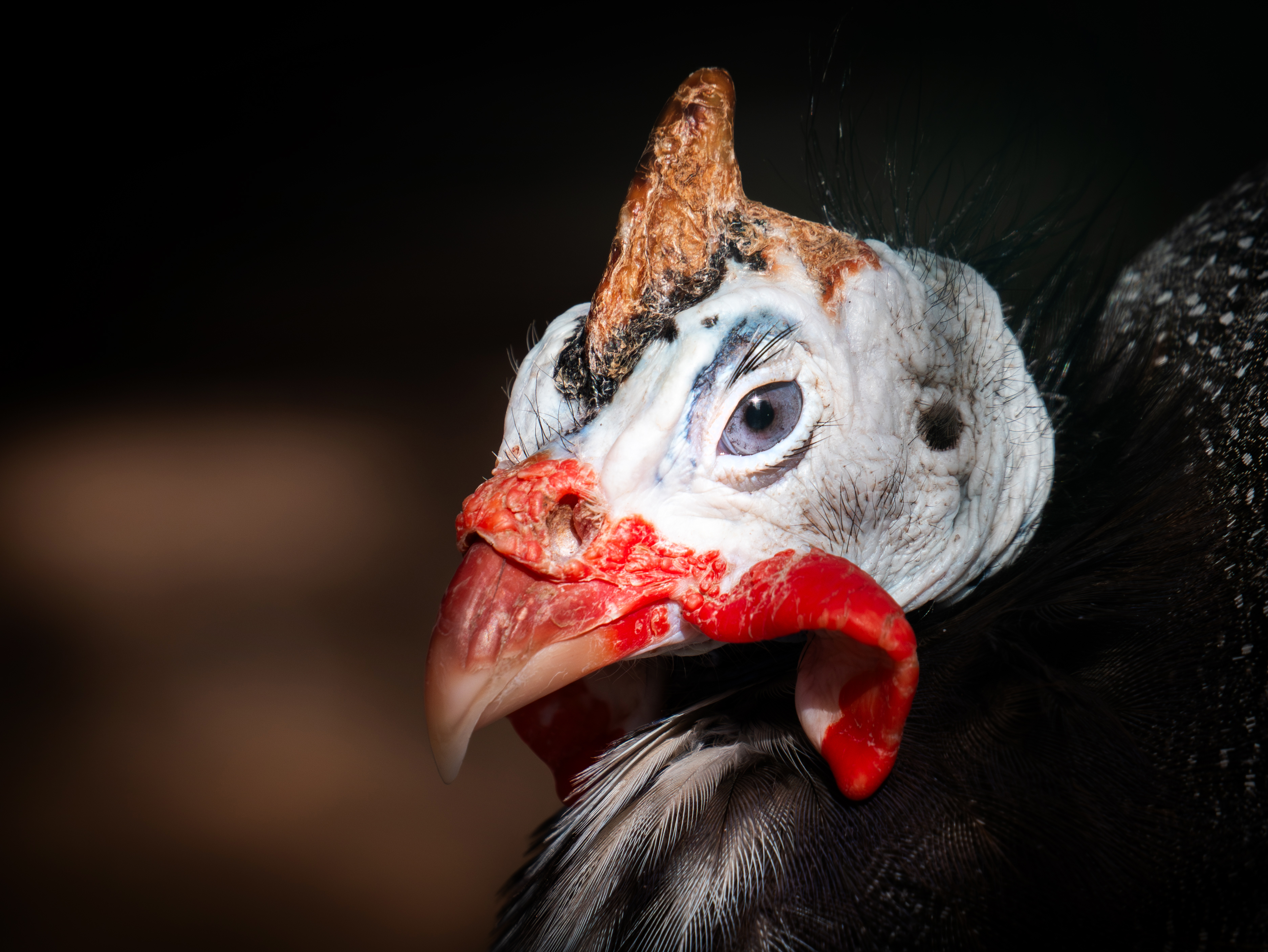
Close up of the head
