= Alessandro Ghigi =

Italian zoologist, naturalist and environmentalist

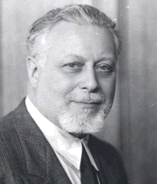
- Born: 9 February 1875; Bologna, Italy
- Died: 20 November 1970 (aged 95); Bologna, Italy
- Occupation: Zoologist
- Known for: Racial purity theories

Alessandro Ghigi (9 February 1875 – 20 November 1970) was an Italian zoologist, naturalist, and environmentalist.

== Life ==
Alessandro Ghigi was born in Bologna on 9 February 1875. He attended the University of Bologna, graduating with a degree in natural sciences. In 1900, he participated in founding the Emilian society Pro Montibus et Sylvis. He was made a doctor of zoology in 1902, teaching at the Agricultural Secondary School in Bologna and at the University of Ferrara. In 1922, he became professor of zoology at Bologna, where he directed the Institute of Zoology. He was rector of the University of Bologna from 1930 to 1943 . In 1911, he was one of the founders of the Italian Journal of Ornithology.

In the first two decades of the 20th century, Ghigi, Erminio Sipari, and Pietro Romualdo Pirotta championed the cause of a national park in the Abruzzo Appennines, and they succeeded in causing the creation of the National Park of Abruzzo, established as a private initiative and inaugurated on 9 September 1922 before obtaining government recognition. In 1933, he founded the Zoology Laboratory, then geared towards hunting, now called the National Institute for Wildlife.

In 1938 Ghigi's name appeared among Italian scientists and intellectuals supporting the Fascist racial laws. In 1939, he published a volume on Biological Problems of race and miscegenation that argued "the superiority of our race" and accused mestizos of being "the cause of decline and disintegration, a wound in natural evolution." He was elected a deputy of the Kingdom of Italy in the XXIV legislature, and on 6 February 1943, he was appointed senator.

In 1951, Ghigi promoted establishment of the Commission for the Conservation of Nature and Natural Resources of the National Research Council, presiding over this committee until his death. In 1954, he co-founded the journal Atura e Montagna, which he directed from 1954 to 1966. He was the author of hundreds of publications, particularly in zoology. He also supervised the volume La Fauna (Milan 1959) of the Italian Touring Club.

== Honors ==
- Grand Officer of the Order of the Crown of Italy
- Commander of the Order of Saints Maurice and Lazarus

== Bibliography ==
- L. Lama, Da un secolo all'altro. Profilo biografico e scritti di Alessandro Ghigi, 1875-1970, Clueb, Bologna 1993;
- M. Spagnesi (a cura di), Alessandro Ghigi naturalista ed ecologo, Atti del Convegno (Bologna, 08.10.1999), Istituto nazionale per la fauna selvatica "A. Ghigi", Savignano 2000;
- F. Pedrotti, Alessandro Ghigi, in Idem, Il fervore dei pochi. Il movimento protezionistico italiano dal 1943 al 1971, Temi, Trento 1998, pp. 168–176.
