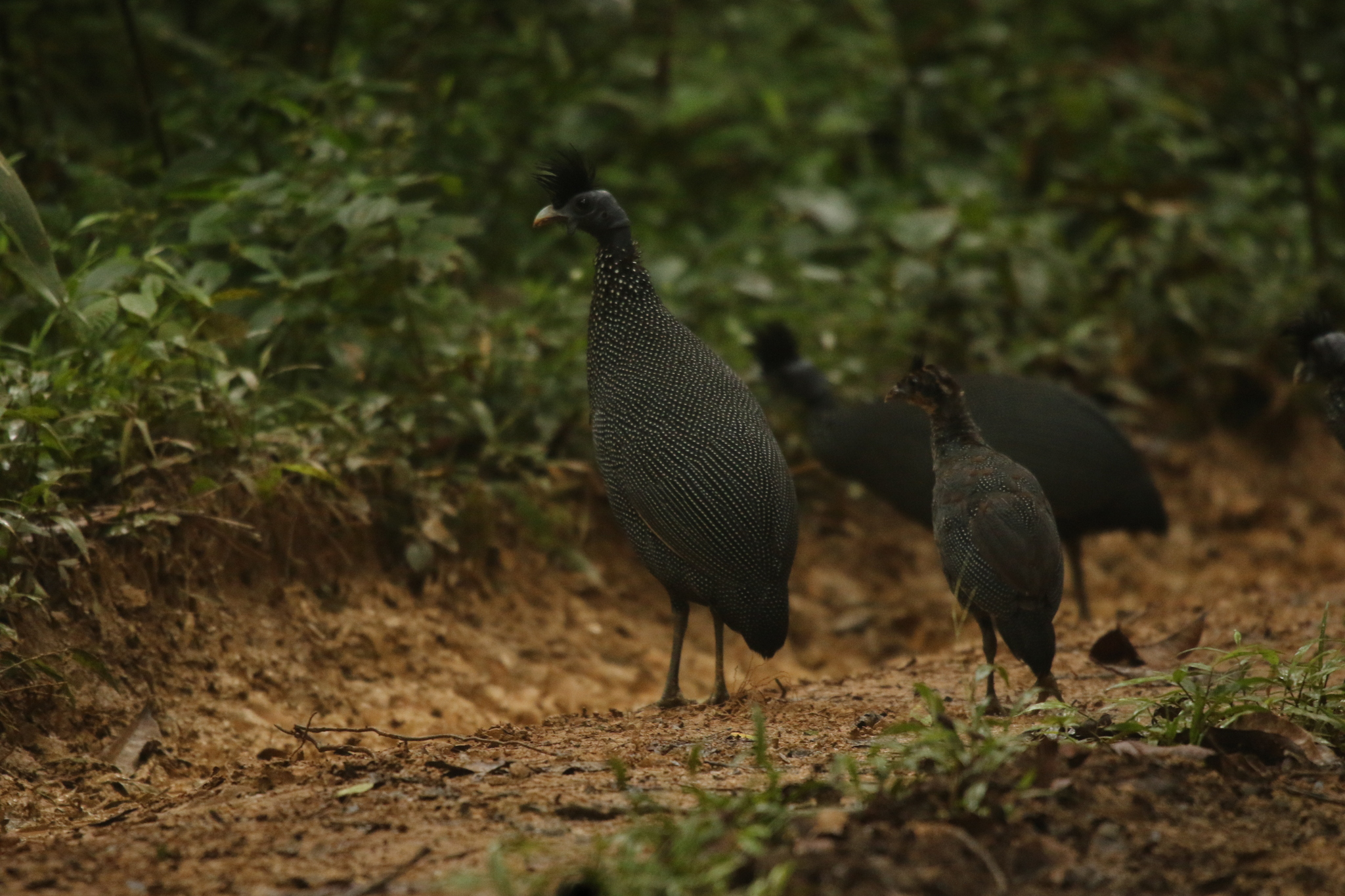

Conservation status
- Least Concern (IUCN 3.1)

Scientific classification
- Kingdom: Animalia
- Phylum: Chordata
- Class: Aves
- Order: Galliformes
- Family: Numididae
- Genus: Guttera
- Species: G. plumifera

Binomial name
- Guttera plumifera (Cassin, 1857)

= Plumed guinea fowl =

Species of bird

The plumed guinea fowl (Guttera plumifera) is a member of the guinea fowl bird family. It is found in humid primary forest in Central Africa. It resembles some subspecies of the crested guinea fowl, but has a straighter (not curled) and higher crest, and a relatively long wattle on either side of the bill. The bare skin on the face and neck is entirely dull grey-blue in the western nominate subspecies, while there are a few orange patches among the grey-blue in the eastern subspecies schubotzi.

== Taxonomy ==
There are two recognized subspecies:

- G. p. plumifera (Cassin, 1857) - Cameroon plumed guinea fowl - southern Cameroon to Congo Basin, northern Gabon, and northern Angola
- G. p. schubotzi (Reichenow, 1912) - Schubotz's plumed guinea fowl - northern Zaire to East African Rift and forests west of Lake Tanganyika
