= Cecil (surname) =

Cecil is a surname of Welsh origin.

The name was associated with Monmouthshire and derives from the Old Welsh personal name Seisyllt. The name may be related to that of the local Celtic tribe (Silures) and the successor kingdom (Essyllwg).

The spelling has been modified greatly as a result of folk etymological association with the Latin name Caecilii, a derivative of caecus ("blind").

== Notable people with the surname ==
Notable people with the surname include:

- Aubrey Vanderbilt Cecil (born 1990), American jewelry designer
- Brad Cecil (born 1999), American football player
- Brett Cecil (born 1986), American baseball pitcher
- Brittanie Cecil (1988–2002), 13-year-old American spectator at an ice hockey game killed by a wayward puck
- Charles Cecil (born 1962), British video game designer
- Chuck Cecil (born 1964), American football player
- David Cecil (courtier) (c. 1460 – 1540), politician and courtier
- Lord David Cecil (1902–1986), British biographer, historian and academic
- Edward Cecil, 1st Viscount Wimbledon (1572–1638), English political and military leader

- Edward Cecil (disambiguation)

- Henry Cecil (disambiguation)
- Malcolm Cecil (1937–2021), British jazz bassist and Grammy Award-winning record producer
- Mary Cecil, 2nd Baroness Amherst of Hackney (1857–1919)
- Nora Cecil (1878–1951), British-American character actress
- Rex Cecil (1916–1966), American baseball pitcher 1944–1945
- Richard Cecil (courtier) (ca. 1495 –1553), English nobleman, politician, courtier,
- Robert Cecil (disambiguation)
  - Robert Gascoyne-Cecil (disambiguation), several people
- William Cecil, 1st Baron Burghley or Lord Burghley (1520–1598), English statesman, the chief advisor of Queen Elizabeth I
- Lady William Cecil (1857–1919), name used for publications by Mary Cecil, 2nd Baroness Amherst of Hackney

== See also ==
- Marquess of Salisbury, which has a family name of Cecil
- Marquess of Exeter, which has a family name of Cecil
