= Georgina Gascoyne-Cecil, Marchioness of Salisbury =

British political hostess (1827–1899)

The Most Honourable The Marchioness of Salisbury VA CI
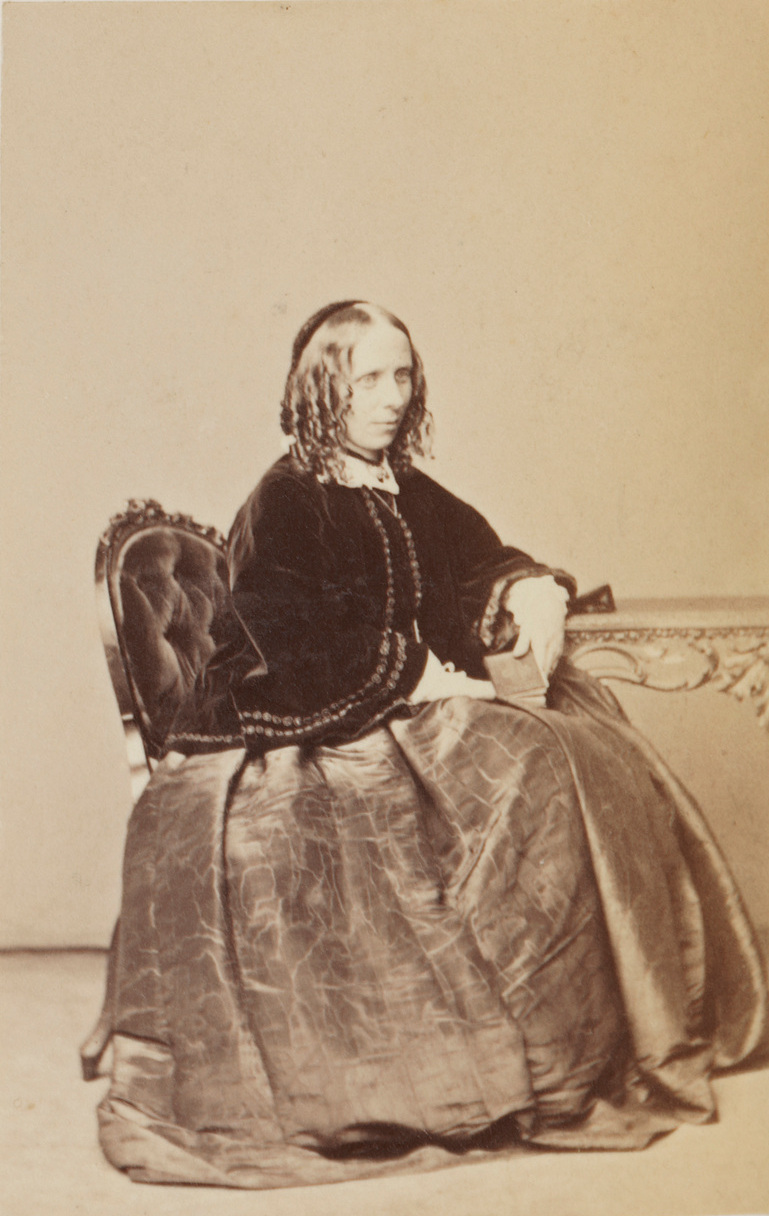
- Photograph, c. 1862
- Born: Georgina Charlotte Alderson; 1827; United Kingdom of Great Britain and Ireland
- Died: 20 November 1899 (aged 71–72); Hatfield House, Hertfordshire, England
- Buried: St Etheldreda's Church, Hatfield
- Spouse: Robert Gascoyne-Cecil, 3rd Marquess of Salisbury (m. 1857)
- Issue: Maud Palmer, Countess of Selborne; Lady Gwendolen Gascoyne-Cecil; James Gascoyne-Cecil, 4th Marquess of Salisbury; Lord William Cecil; Robert Cecil, 1st Viscount Cecil of Chelwood; Lord Edward Cecil; Hugh Cecil, 1st Baron Quickswood
- Father: Sir Edward Alderson
- Mother: Georgina Catherine Drewe

Georgina Charlotte Gascoyne-Cecil, Marchioness of Salisbury, VA, CI (née Alderson; 1827 – 20 November 1899) was a society hostess and the wife of British Prime Minister Robert Gascoyne-Cecil, 3rd Marquess of Salisbury. She was the eldest daughter of a judge. Her relative lack of wealth and social connections earned the disapproval of the 2nd Marquess of Salisbury; despite this, she married his son Robert in 1857.

Though the marriage was happy and grew to include eight children, Robert and Georgina's first years together were pinched financially. To supplement their income, Lady Georgina aided her husband as he contributed political articles to various newspapers. Their circumstances improved when Lord Robert became his father's heir in 1865, and in 1868 he inherited the Salisbury title. She hosted parties and receptions at Hatfield House and in London that aided his political career in the Conservative Party.

== Family and early life ==
Few biographical details have been published about Georgina Charlotte Alderson. Born in 1827, she was the eldest daughter of Sir Edward Hall Alderson (d. 1857), a judge. In 1834, he was made a Baron of the Exchequer. Her mother was Georgina Catherine Drewe (d. 1871), a daughter of the Reverend Edward Drewe of Broadhembury, Devonshire. The Aldersons had a large family.

== Marriage ==
On 11 July 1857, Georgina Alderson married Lord Robert Cecil, a younger son of James Gascoyne-Cecil, 2nd Marquess of Salisbury. The period leading up to the wedding was contentious. Georgina did not come from an aristocratic or wealthy background. She was also nearly thirty-years old, two years older than his son, and Lord Salisbury feared her ability to produce an heir. He tried to dissuade the union, and required them to remain separated for six months, hoping the match would end. This period did not lead to a dissolution of the relationship; instead, Lord Robert wrote to his father at the end of the break and said he was engaged to Georgina. The furious marquess considered disinheriting his son; after the wedding he and Robert became estranged.

A love match, the marriage would prove to be happy. Historians have described Georgina as clever, witty, and gregarious. In his entry for her husband in the Oxford Dictionary of National Biography, Paul Smith describes Georgina as "a buoyant and forceful woman" who "share[d] his intellectual interests and encourage[d] and facilitate[d] his career".

Their family grew quickly, beginning with the birth of a daughter within a year of their marriage. Seven children followed – five sons and three daughters in total. For eight years, they lived under pinched circumstances in various places within London and Surrey. The young couple had little income during their first years together; Georgina only had £100 a year, and he had a further £400 from his mother. From 1856 onward, Lord Robert supplemented their annual income by contributing political articles to such publications as the Saturday Review and the Quarterly Review. During this period, in addition to raising their growing family, she acted as her husband's literary assistant.

== Marchioness of Salisbury ==
The Cecils' lifestyle changed in 1865 upon the death of the Marquess of Salisbury's eldest son. Robert, now Viscount Cranborne, suddenly became the heir to his father's title and estates. A suitable allowance was provided for his large family. In 1868 Robert inherited the title of Marquess of Salisbury upon the death of his father. They moved into the family seat of Hatfield House, Hertfordshire, which had twenty-thousand acres and 127 rooms. Georgina suddenly found herself overseeing the workings of the large estate, a considerable task since her husband devoted most of his attention to its farming; other estate matters, which included its general maintenance as well as the care of its poorer tenants, fell under Georgina's oversight.

Robert, now known as Lord Salisbury, had a reserved nature in public and disliked social occasions. His wife thus took a prominent role during parties and gatherings, regularly hosting national and international political figures in London and at Hatfield House. These activities aided her husband's political career. She also acted as his confidante and regularly advised him, based on their surviving correspondence. A member of the Conservative Party, he became Prime Minister in June 1885. He held the premiership until January 1886, then attained it again from July 1886–August 1892 and June 1895–July 1902.

Lady Salisbury was also active in political organisations. She was a leading member of the Primrose League, known for being the first British political group to give women a prominent role. At first she disliked the group, as she disapproved of its co-founder Lord Randolph Churchill and believed its medieval influences were silly and absurd; she also disapproved of the idea that women could be public in political life and give speeches. But she eventually joined the group after realising its Conservative connections would help her husband's career.

After falling ill in 1898, Lady Salisbury journeyed to their villa in Beaulieu-sur-Mer near Nice, France, hoping this would improve her health. She died at Hatfield House on 20 November 1899, surrounded by her husband and most of their children. After her death, The Daily Telegraph wrote: "Without exactly assuming the functions of a leader of society, Lady Salisbury was in all the later years of her life essentially grande dame, and discharged duties, social, political, and personal, which were of the highest moment and utility." Lord Salisbury died on 22 August 1903, and was buried beside her at St Etheldreda's Church, Hatfield. She was a member of the Royal Order of Victoria and Albert and the Order of the Crown of India.

== Issue ==
They had eight children:

- Lady Beatrix Maud Gascoyne-Cecil (11 April 1858 – 27 April 1950), married William Waldegrave Palmer, 2nd Earl of Selborne
- Lady Gwendolen Gascoyne-Cecil (28 July 1860 – 28 September 1945), author, biographer of her father; unmarried
- James Gascoyne-Cecil, 4th Marquess of Salisbury (1861–1947)
- Lord (Rupert Ernest) William Gascoyne-Cecil (1863–1936)
- (Edgar Algernon) Robert Gascoyne-Cecil, 1st Viscount Cecil of Chelwood (1864–1958)
- Lady Fanny Georgina Mildred Gascoyne-Cecil (1865 – 24 April 1867), died as an infant
- Lord Edward Gascoyne-Cecil (1867–1918)
- Hugh Richard Heathcote Gascoyne-Cecil, 1st Baron Quickswood (1869–1956)
