= Lady Gwendolen Cecil =

British author

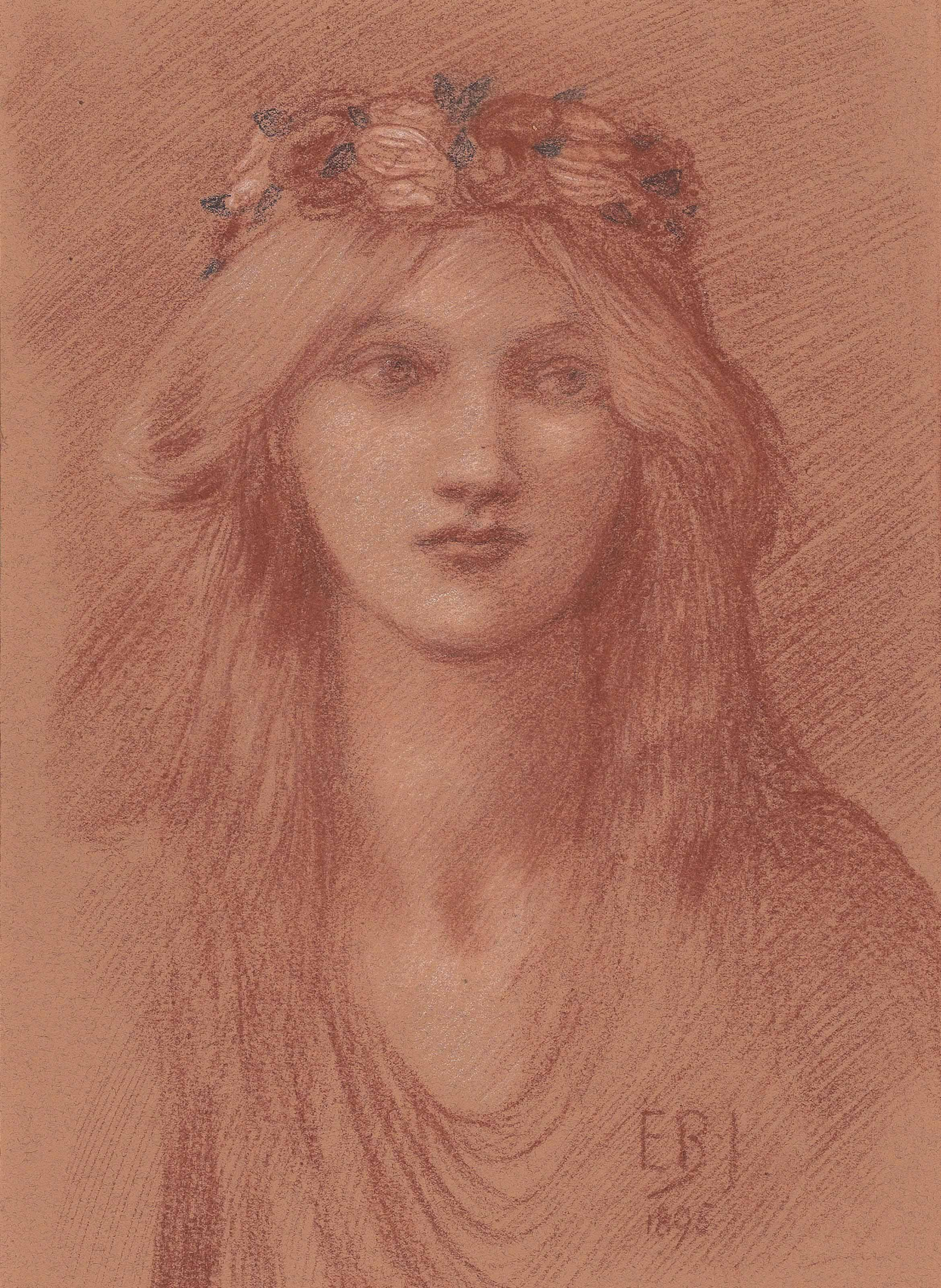
- Lady Gwendolen, 1895, Edward Coley Burne-Jones
- Born: Hon. Gwendolen Gascoyne-Cecil; 3 July 1860; St Pancras, London, England
- Died: 28 September 1945 (aged 85); Hatfield, Hertfordshire
- Occupation: Writer
- Parent(s): Robert Gascoyne-Cecil, 3rd Marquess of Salisbury; Georgina Alderson

Lady Gwendolen Georgiana Gascoyne-Cecil (3 July 1860 – 28 September 1945) was a British author and aristocrat who wrote a four-volume biography of her father, Prime Minister Robert Gascoyne-Cecil, titled Life of Robert, Marquis of Salisbury.

== Early life and family ==
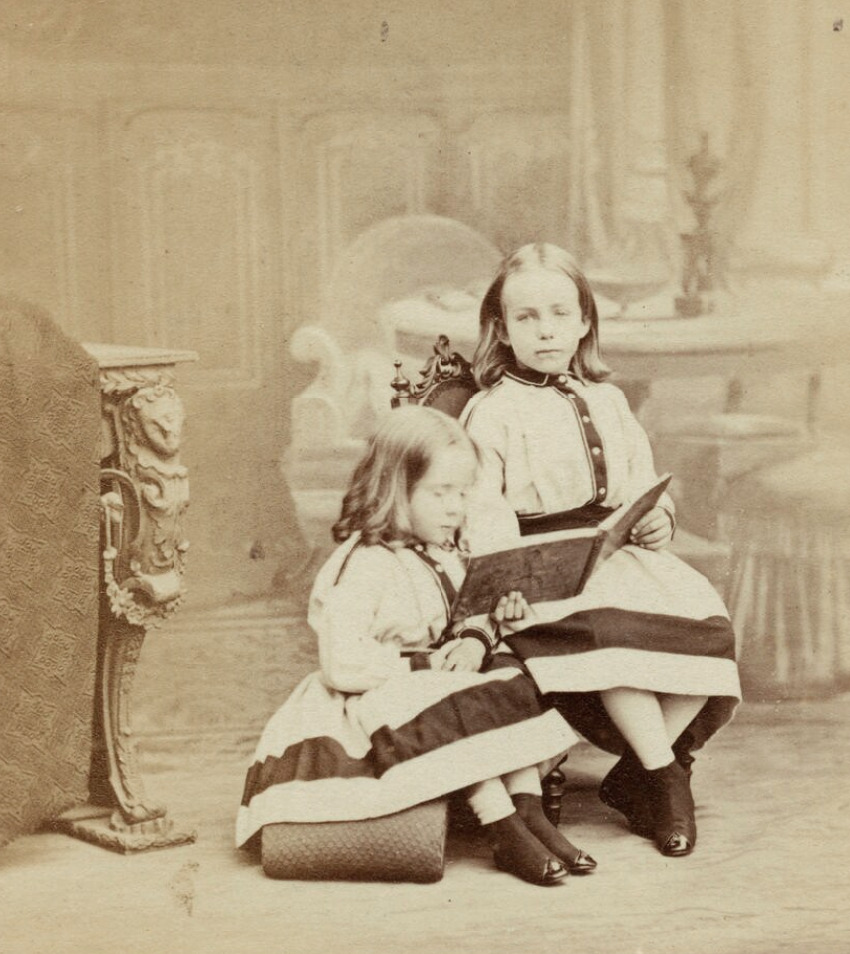
Lady Gwendolen and her elder sister, Lady Maud, c. 1865

Lady Gwendolen was born on 3 July 1860 in St Pancras, London, the second of seven surviving children of the 3rd Marquess of Salisbury and his wife, the former Georgina Alderson. She was baptised on 28 July at St Mary Magdalene in Camden, London.

Lady Gwendolen and her siblings were all accomplished intellectuals. Her elder sister was the suffragist Maud Palmer, Countess of Selborne. Her brothers were James Gascoyne-Cecil, Viscount Cranborne (later the 4th Marquess of Salisbury); Lord William Cecil (later Bishop of Exeter); Lord Robert Cecil (later Viscount Cecil of Chelwood), a Nobel Prize winner; military reformer Lord Edward Cecil; and politician Lord Hugh Cecil (later Baron Quickswood).

== Career ==
The first two volumes of the biography of her father appeared in 1921 and were immediately well received. In July 1931, the third volume, covering the years 1880–86, was published, giving insight into his family life at the same time he took office in 1885, as well as events such as Lord Randolph Churchill's resignation as Chancellor of the Exchequer. The fourth volume, covering the years 1887–1892, was published in December 1931, and dealt primarily with Lord Salisbury's foreign policy.

She also wrote a short story titled "The Little Ray" for the August 1894 edition of Pall Mall Magazine. In 1895, Lady Gwendolen was revealed as the author of the story "The Closed Cabinet", a work once considered anonymous.

In 1878, British Prime Minister Benjamin Disraeli stayed at her family home and he wrote to Queen Victoria that he had rarely met (referring to Gwendolen and her sister) "more intelligent and agreeable women".

Lady Gwendolen was also a talented mathematician.

== Death ==
Lady Gwendolen died in 1945 at Hatfield House. She was eulogised in a letter to The Times by her sister-in-law Violet Milner, Viscountess Milner, who wrote:

Her intellectual gifts were undeniable, and her zest for life and politics was as great as that of her relatives, while her wit illuminated every subject she touched on. But her brain was not the thing we adored in her. Her heart, her power of love, her incessant helpfulness, made her the family centre after her mother's death. The growing families of her brothers and sister—two families lived in Hatfield House and one a stone's throw away—brought their nursery problems and their school-room problems to her. She was surrounded by the children: they were all over her and she was wonderful with them. The advantage to them of having a first rate mind to carry their troubles to was beyond price. But this picture of a benevolent aunt is far below Lady Gwendolen's merits. For she had a really original mind and no one ever saw her without being startled, awakened, by some unexpected thought or phrase. Her nephews and nieces will never forget her and to all who knew her her name lives for evermore.

— V.M., The Times, 2 October 1945
