= Edward Cecil =

Edward Cecil may refer to:

- Edward Cecil, 1st Viscount Wimbledon (1572–1638), English military and naval commander
- Lord Edward Cecil (1867–1918), British soldier and colonial administrator
- Edward Cecil (actor) (1878–1940), American film actor
- Edward Cecil, Viscount Cranborne, 1980s British Page of Honour

== See also ==
- Edward Cecil-Smith (1903–1963), Canadian communist, propagandist and soldier
- Edward Cecil Guinness, 1st Earl of Iveagh (1847–1927), Anglo-Irish businessman and philanthropist
