= Robert Gascoyne-Cecil =

Robert Gascoyne-Cecil may refer to:

- Robert Gascoyne-Cecil, 3rd Marquess of Salisbury (1830–1903), British statesman and Prime Minister
- Robert Gascoyne-Cecil, 1st Viscount Cecil of Chelwood (1864–1958), British politician and diplomat, and an architect of the League of Nations
- Robert Gascoyne-Cecil, 5th Marquess of Salisbury (1893–1972), prominent Tory politician
- Robert Gascoyne-Cecil, 6th Marquess of Salisbury (1916–2003), Conservative Member of Parliament for Bournemouth West
- Robert Gascoyne-Cecil, 7th Marquess of Salisbury (born 1946), Conservative politician

== See also ==
- Robert Cecil (disambiguation)
