= Conservative and Unionist Women's Franchise Association =

British women's suffrage organisation

The Conservative and Unionist Women's Franchise Association (CUWFA) was a British women's suffrage organisation open to members of the Conservative and Unionist Party. Formed in 1908 by members of the National Union of Women's Suffrage Societies, CUWFA was the third-largest suffrage organisation in Britain before the First World War.

== Formation ==
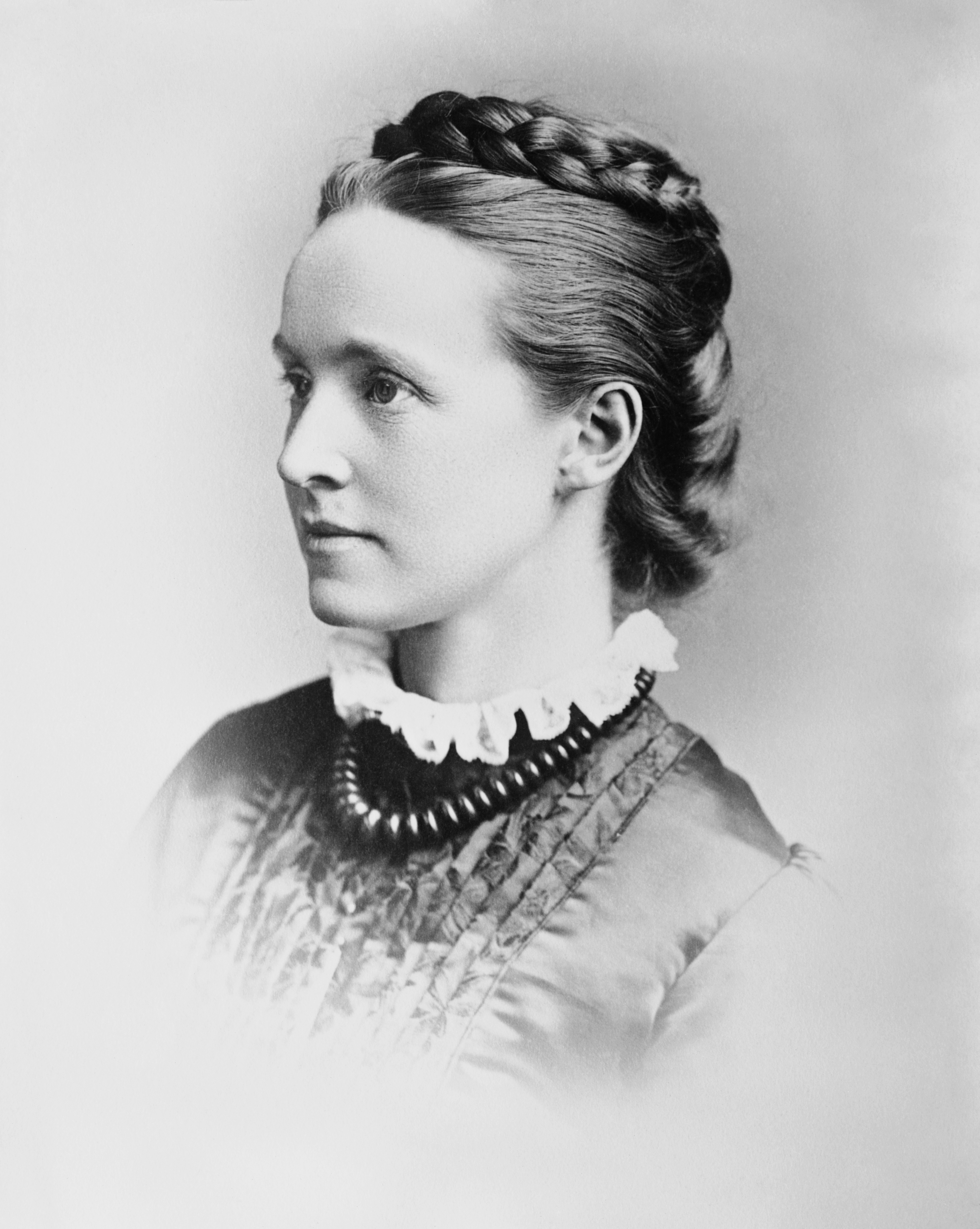
Millicent Fawcett, leader of the NUWSS

CUWFA was initially made up of Conservative members of the National Union of Women's Suffrage Societies (NUWSS), who at the suggestion of Millicent Fawcett identified themselves as a separate group at the NUWSS march in June 1908. The Association was formally created in November 1908 as a result of this march, and was open to members of the Conservative and Unionist Party who supported the "extension of the Franchise to all duly qualified women". Unlike other conservative organisations such as the Primrose League, CUWFA was a single-issue organisation interested only in the enfranchisement of women.

The Association was formed for various reasons. The creation of organisations such as the Men's League for Opposing Woman Suffrage in the Conservative Party meant that the Party was in danger of becoming largely anti-suffragist unless effective opposition could be organised. In addition the Liberal and Labour Parties held the majority in the House of Commons, and as both supported the Suffrage movement it was thought "inevitable" that a bill granting women the right to vote would be pushed through Parliament. The formation of an organised group of Conservatives to promote women's suffrage would prevent the Conservative Party being politically outflanked on the issue. If the Conservative Party became more moderate on the issue of women's suffrage they could play some part in moderating the eventual bill, rather than simply protesting as the Liberal-Labour majority pushed it through Parliament. A Conservative pro-suffrage group was also intended to prevent pro-suffrage women and men leaving the Conservative Party, which would damage the party's standing.

== Organisation ==
Immediately after being formed the Association invited Lady Knightley to become the first President. Lady Selborne took over as President in 1910, and continued as such until 1913, when she was succeeded by the Countess of Fingall. The Presidents were assisted by "an impressive array of eminently titled vice-presidents"; in 1913 there were three Duchesses, three Marchionesses, four Earls and many other members of the nobility working for the Association. By 1913 the Association had 61 different local branches, including one in Ireland which was opened in 1909. Local branch presidents included peeress Marie Frances Lisette Hanbury, Baroness Willoughby de Broke.

== Activities ==
The Association attempted to return Members of Parliament who supported the enfranchisement of "all duly qualified women", and educated such "qualified women" in how to exercise their right to vote once it became available. Although The Times accused them of threatening to withdraw support from Conservative candidates who did not support the Conciliation Bill they denied this, claiming they did not act against anti-suffragist Conservative candidates. They were helpful in stymieing the Anti-suffragist movement by denying them support in the Conservative Party, which they had considered to be a bastion of support. They ran two newspapers, the Conservative and Unionist Women's Franchise Review and the Monthly News of the Conservative and Unionist Women's Franchise Association. The Association became inactive in 1914, when the outbreak of the First World War forced them to suspend their activities. The Representation of the People Act 1918, passed after the end of the First World War, granted the right to vote to the women that the Association had been representing, making their continued existence moot.

== Bibliography ==
- Auchterlonie, Mitzi (2007) Conservative Suffragists: The Women's Vote and the Tory Party, I.B. Tauris. ISBN 978-1-84511-485-5
- Pugh, Martin (2007). The March of the Women: A Revisionist Analysis of the Campaign for Women's Suffrage, 1866-1914. Oxford University Press. ISBN 978-0-19-925022-6.
- Gordon, Peter (2005). Dictionary of British Women's Organisations, 1825-1960: 1825-1960. Routledge. ISBN 0-7130-4045-9.
- Barberis, Peter (2005). Encyclopedia of British and Irish political organizations parties, groups and movements of the 20th century. Continuum International Publishing Group. ISBN 0-8264-5814-9.
- Sidgwick, Eleanor Mildred, 1845-1936 The progress of the women's suffrage movement Cambridge, Bowes & Bowes 1913
