= Cecil Roberts (disambiguation) =

Cecil Roberts (1892–1976) was an English writer

Cecil Roberts may also refer to:

- Cecil Roberts (labor unionist) (born 1946), American miner and union leader
- Cecil Roberts (politician) (1877–1961), Australian politician

== See also ==
- Robert Cecil (disambiguation)
