= Maud Palmer, Countess of Selborne =

British political and women's rights activist

The Right Honourable The Countess of Selborne
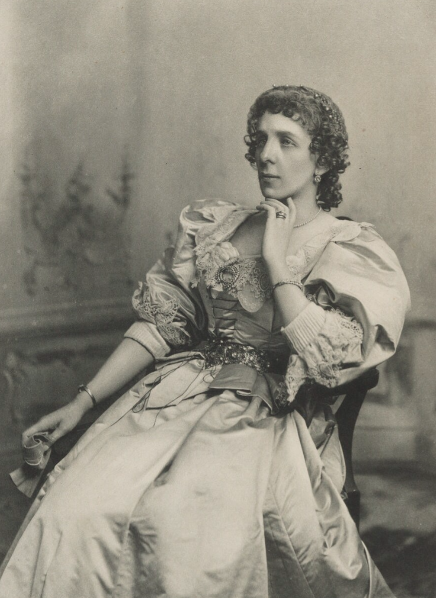
- Beatrix Maud (née Cecil), Countess of Selborne in 1897 by Lafayette

President of the Conservative and Unionist Women's Franchise Association
- In office 1910–1913
- Preceded by: Louisa Knightley
- Succeeded by: Countess of Fingall

President of the National Council of Women of Great Britain & Ireland
- In office 1920–1921
- Preceded by: Maria Ogilvie Gordon
- Succeeded by: Frances Balfour

Personal details
- Born: Beatrix Maud Gascoyne-Cecil; 11 April 1858 Marylebone, London, England
- Died: 27 April 1950 (aged 92)
- Party: Conservative
- Spouse: William Palmer, 2nd Earl of Selborne (m. 1883; died 1942)
- Children: Mabel Grey, Countess Grey; Roundell Palmer, 3rd Earl of Selborne; Hon. Robert Palmer; Hon. Lewis Palmer
- Parent(s): Robert Gascoyne-Cecil, 3rd Marquess of Salisbury; Georgina Alderson
- Occupation: Activist

Beatrix Maud Palmer, Countess of Selborne (11 April 1858 – 27 April 1950) was a British political and women's rights activist.

== Early life ==
Born in Marylebone as Beatrix Maud Gascoyne-Cecil, she was the eldest child of future Prime Minister Robert Gascoyne-Cecil, and his wife, the former Georgina Alderson.

Maud was not formally educated, but acquired an interest in conservatism and political affairs through her family and the local Primrose League.

== Politics ==
At the 1885 general election, her husband William, then Viscount Woolmer, was elected as a Liberal Party Member of Parliament, and while Maud remained a staunch Conservative Party supporter, she gradually won William to her views, as he first joined the Liberal Unionist Party split, then later became associated with the far right of the Conservative Party.

From 1905, William held various senior posts in South Africa, and Maud moved with him, associating herself with various local charities. They returned to the UK in 1910, and she became president of the Conservative and Unionist Women's Franchise Association. In this role, she toured the country, speaking in support of women's suffrage. While she initially only supported votes for wealthy single women, she later also supported the enfranchisement of married women, arguing that most married women were conservative. She stood down in 1913, and once World War I started, focused instead on promoting patriotism.

After the end of the war, the countess was less active, but became a Justice of the Peace in Hampshire, and served as president of the National Council of Women of Great Britain & Ireland in 1920/21.

== Marriage and family ==
In 1883, Maud married William Palmer, Viscount Wolmer. They had three sons and one daughter.

- Lady Mabel Laura Georgiana Palmer (6 October 1884 – 15 July 1958); married Charles Grey, 5th Earl Grey, and had two daughters.
- Roundell Cecil Palmer, 3rd Earl of Selborne (15 April 1887 – 3 September 1971); married, firstly, Hon. Grace Ridley in 1910; had issue. Married, secondly, Valerie Irene Josephine Margaret de Thomka de Thomkahaza in 1966; no issue.
- Hon. Robert Stafford Arthur Palmer (26 September 1888 – 21 January 1916)
- Hon. William Jocelyn Lewis Palmer (15 September 1894 – 6 June 1971); married Hon. Dorothy Cicely Sybil Loder, daughter of Gerald Loder, 1st Baron Wakehurst in 1922 and had two children.

Their eldest son, Roundell, eventually succeeded his father in the earldom as the 3rd Earl of Selborne. Their second son, the Hon. Robert Palmer, was a captain in the Hampshire Regiment and was killed on active service in 1916. Their daughter, Lady Mabel Laura Georgiana Palmer, became Countess Grey as the wife of Charles Grey, 5th Earl Grey.

William succeeded as Earl of Selborne in 1895, and Maud therefore became Countess of Selborne.

== Legacy ==
Her name and picture (and those of 58 other women's suffrage supporters) are on the plinth of the statue of Millicent Fawcett in Parliament Square, London, unveiled in 2018.

There is a place called Lady Selborne near Pretoria that was bulldozed away during the apartheid era. Reparations have seen some of the historic occupants reclaiming their land despite local opposition. Many however have taken compensation.

Party political offices
Preceded by Louisa Knightley	President of the Conservative and Unionist Women's Franchise Association; 1910–1913	Succeeded by Countess of Fingall
Non-profit organization positions
Preceded by Maria Ogilvie Gordon	President of the National Council of Women of Great Britain & Ireland; 1920–1921	Succeeded by Frances Balfour
