= Robert Cecil =

Robert Cecil may refer to:

- Robert Cecil, 1st Earl of Salisbury (1563–1612), English administrator and politician, MP for Westminster, and for Hertfordshire
- Robert Cecil (1670–1716), member of parliament for Castle Rising, and for Wootton Basset
- Robert Cecil (Old Sarum MP) (died 1657), English politician
- Robert Cecil, 1st Viscount Cecil of Chelwood (1864–1958) British lawyer, politician and diplomat
- Robert Cecil (diplomat, born 1913) (1913–1994), British diplomat and writer

== See also ==
- Cecil Roberts (disambiguation)
- Robert Gascoyne-Cecil (disambiguation)
