= Henry Cecil (disambiguation) =

Henry Cecil (1943–2013) was an English horse racing trainer.

Henry Cecil may also refer to:

- Henry Cecil, 1st Marquess of Exeter (1754–1804), British peer and Member of Parliament
- Henry Cecil Leon (1902–1976), British lawyer and author who used the pen name Henry Cecil
- a pen name of American writer David H. Keller (1880–1966)
