= Lord Edward Cecil =

British Colonial administrator

Lord Edward Cecil KCMG DSO
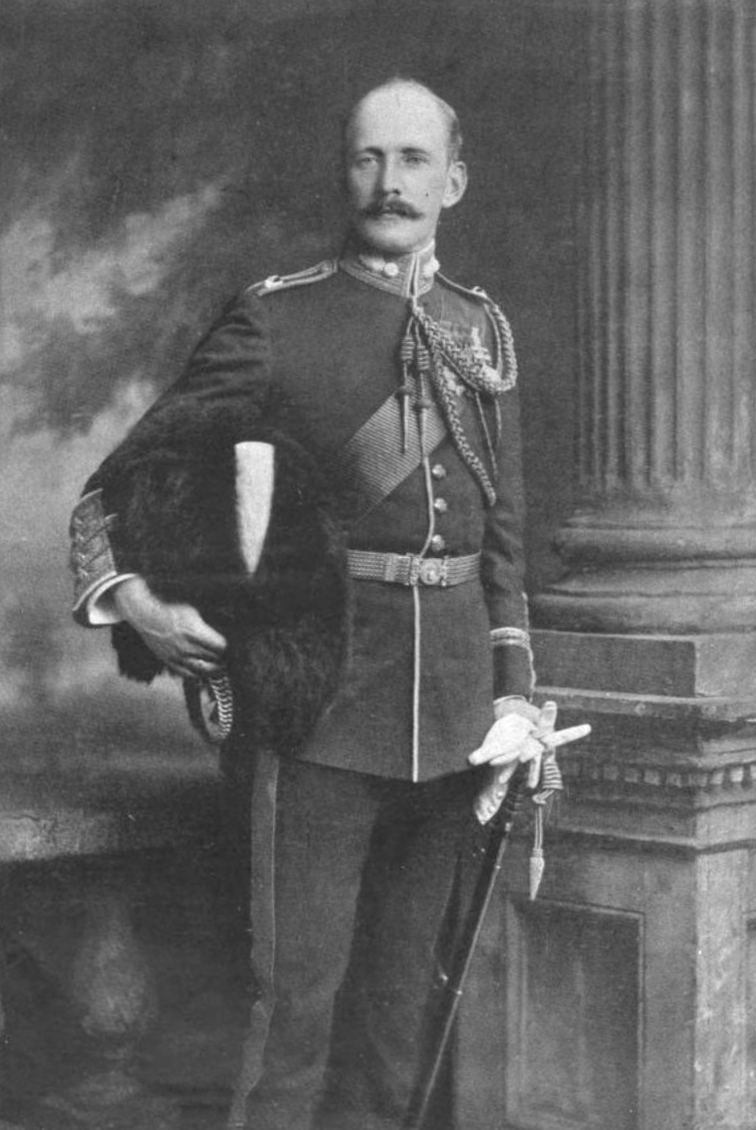
- In The Sketch, 1 November 1899
- Born: Edward Herbert Gascoyne-Cecil; 12 July 1867; Hatfield House, Hertfordshire, England
- Died: 13 December 1918 (aged 51); Leysin, Switzerland
- Spouse: Violet Georgina Maxse (m. 1894)
- Children: 2
- Military career
- Allegiance: United Kingdom
- Branch: British Army
- Service years: 17 years
- Rank: Brevet Lieutenant-Colonel
- Nickname: Nigs
- Unit: Grenadier Guards
- Commands: ADC (Egypt) to Lord Kitchener, Military Secretary to Lord Kitchener.
- Conflicts: Second Boer War

Lord Edward Herbert Gascoyne-Cecil KCMG DSO (12 July 1867 – 13 December 1918), known as Lord Edward Cecil, was a distinguished and highly decorated English soldier. As colonial administrator in Egypt and advisor to the Liberal government, he helped to implement Army reforms.

== Biography ==
Lord Edward was born on 12 July 1867, the fourth son of Robert Gascoyne-Cecil, 3rd Marquess of Salisbury and Georgina Charlotte. When Edward was born, his father asked the Earl of Carnarvon to be a godfather. He was educated at Eton College, but did badly in his exams, failing to get into Sandhurst, which his father blamed on the school (because he had been bullied there). His family called him "Nigs", which his mother used when writing to him at boarding school. When only 11 years old, he wrote a play on "The Eastern Question" from his father's foreign office papers. The tone of the play was anti-Beaconsfield, showing a resentment for a longevity in office. Written in 1878, at the time of Congress of Berlin, perhaps unaware that Beaconsfield had only three years to live, the Prime Minister is personified as Dickens' 'Artful Dodger'. A latent racism was characteristic of Cecilian "clannish" behaviour.

Gascoyne-Cecil became a Second Lieutenant in the Grenadier Guards in 1887. He served for four years in the regiment before being promoted first lieutenant and appointed to the staff of Field Marshal Garnet Wolseley. On the Dongola Expedition in 1896 he served with distinction: mentioned in despatches, he was promoted a Brevet Major, winning the Order of Medjidie 4th Class and the Khedive's Star for service in Egypt and Sudan, with two clasps. He was aide de camp to Lord Kitchener in the Egyptian campaign of 1896, who had a profound influence on his career. "All shall be at home known by the proper people" wrote Lord Edward in his diary. The following day, his father Lord Salisbury announced in parliament that Dongola was not the objective, but the conquest of the Sudan, and recapture of Khartoum to avenge the murder of General Gordon.

Cecil was appointed a member of the Rodd Mission to the Emperor Menelik II of Abyssinia in 1897 that negotiated the Anglo-Ethiopian Treaty of 1897. The following year the Fashoda incident occurred when Captain Marchand leading a small military expedition occupied the White Nile town of Fashoda in present-day South Sudan after an epic 14-month march from West Africa, and claimed the area for France in opposition to Anglo-Egyptian claims, bringing the two powers close to war. On 18 September Lord Edward arrived at Fashoda with Kitchener's expeditionary force of five steam-boats carrying 100 Highlanders, 2,500 Sudanese troops and four machine guns. Kitchener set up a meeting on 19 September at which they drank whisky and champagne with Marchand. The French troops withdrew on 3 November on instruction from Paris. On the Nile Expedition they conquered Darfur and annexed the South of Sudan. Kitchener's army returned in triumph to a speech at the Mansion House. In Cimiez, south of France that summer an elated Queen congratulated Salisbury. In the campaign which culminated at the battle of Omdurman he was mentioned in despatches at the battle of Atbara and for his part in the recapture of Khartoum he was mentioned in despatches and won two clasps. Cecil was present at the battle of Omdurman.

=== With Kitchener and Baden-Powell in South Africa ===
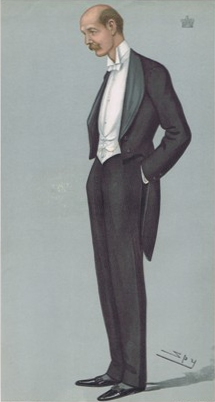
"at Mafeking" Cecil as caricatured by Spy (Leslie Ward) in Vanity Fair, November 1899

On 3 July 1899, Colonel Baden-Powell was informed by Wolseley at the War Office that he should go immediately to Mafeking, taking Lord Edward Cecil as his Chief Staff Officer. They sailed on 8 July, Cecil taking Violet with him. When they landed at Cape Town, Cecil went to contractors Julius Weil & Co to order £500,000 worth of supplies for what Cecil correctly anticipated would be a long siege. As the Prime Minister's son, Cecil's signature carried weight with Weil & Co although, the Cecils expected parliament would approve the amount.

In October 1899, Cecil was serving with Colonel Baden-Powell, when besieged at Mafeking. 30 October was known as 'Mournful Monday' as three British columns surrendered; the situation became desperate. As second-in-command Cecil imposed the death penalty for spying, looting, trespassing, and loitering outside a women's laager at night. He was in charge of provisioning: when the food ran out the people had to eat dogs and horses, there was one reported case of cannibalism. 478 people died during the siege. Baden-Powell kept the Boers tied down for seven months, only to emerge later as a national hero. On 5 January, The Times reported that Cecil was in hospital in Mafeking with fever.

Cecil set up the Mafeking Cadet Corps that led onto Baden-Powell founding the Scouts later on. Cecil was chivalrous towards women, but it became clear that the English expected the blacks to starve first. When the siege was finally lifted on 17 May 1900, there was ecstatic rejoicing in London at the news. Cecil had a poignant reunion with his wife at Mafeking on 29 June, and then rode out north into the Transvaal. Lady Edward was staying at Groote Schuur and probably conducting an affair with Lord Milner. Frances teased the Prime Minister "Gainst death could wrestle with Gallant young Cecil!" When Lord Edward Cecil came home to a triumphant welcome at Hatfield House his father had written off his debts, and the whole town turned out to cheer as the celebrations began on 18 December. The houses were decorated with bunting, the brewery men decked out in livery. Lord Edward made a speech, and was formally thanked by Lord Salisbury. They lit a huge bonfire in the park with fireworks.

The following day C-in-C, General Buller landed with an army at Cape Town. During the Second Boer War he was mentioned in despatches, made Brevet Lieutenant-Colonel, awarded the Queen's Medal, with two clasps. In February 1902, Cecil was appointed as Military Secretary to the Sirdar, Lord Kitchener travelling back to Egypt. The Cecils remained bullish and optimistic, but Kitchener estimated there were about 5,000 Boers left in the field. Edward was the only son never to see his father at the death, he had embarked from Egypt three days before on 19 August 1903.

=== Later career ===
Cecil was appointed Agent-General to the Government of Sudan and Director of Intelligence at Cairo for two years. Returning to Britain the new Liberal Government invited Lord Edward Cecil to be Under-Secretary of War in 1906. He was Under-Secretary of Finance from 1907 until 1913, and Financial Advisor to War Office from 1912 until the end of the Great War. In 1915 he was awarded Grand Cordon Order of the Nile. He spent most of the last year of his life receiving treatment for tuberculosis in Switzerland, where he died at midnight on the 13–14 December.

=== Character ===
Cecil was a tough but dissolute army officer, laden with gambling debts. He was a keen baccarat player, a charming fellow, and a well known raconteur. He was always tapping his father for money, demonstrable in the copious notes in the Cecil family correspondence but Lord Salisbury's patience ran out in 1891. In May 1891, he paid in £1,126.8s.6d, money originally intended for his unmarried sister, Lady Gwendolen. However, while fighting abroad, the mess bills continued to mount, and by May 1894 he owed another £2,000 (equivalent to £225,000 in 2025).

His book, The Leisure of an Egyptian Official, published posthumously in 1921, gives a detailed account of his role and interactions with the Egyptian politicians in nominal control of the country.

== Personal life ==
Lord Edward Cecil married Violet Georgina Maxse, second daughter of Admiral Frederick Augustus Maxse, a son of Baron Berkeley on 18 June 1894, at St Saviour's Church, Chelsea. The officiant was his brother Rev. Lord William Cecil. A wide range of society guests appeared at the wedding, Asquith, Morley and Chamberlain, as well as his cousin Balfour and father Salisbury, and liberal poets Blunt and Wilde. The couple had two children a son and a daughter. George Edward Gascoyne-Cecil, born on 9 September 1895, became a second lieutenant in the Grenadier Guards and was killed in action on 1 September 1914, near Villers-Cotterets, France. Helen Mary Gascoyne-Cecil, born on 11 May 1901, became an author and married Alexander Hardinge, 2nd Baron Hardinge of Penshurst. She died in 1979.

Lady Edward Cecil was appointed Grand Dame of the Order of St John, and Chevalier of the Légion d'honneur. After Lord Edward's death, at Leysin, Switzerland on 13 December 1918, his widow remarried. Her second husband was the first and last Viscount Milner (died 13 May 1925).

=== Own works ===
- The Leisure of an Egyptian Official (reprinted 2008, with a new Introduction by Julian Hardinge (Hardinge Simpole))

== Bibliography ==
=== Manuscripts ===
- Lord Edward Cecil Papers, Bodleian Library, Oxford.

=== Primary source ===
- Hugh & Mirabel Cecil, Imperial Marriage: An Edwardian War and Peace, 2002
- Lord David Cecil, The Cecils of Hatfield House, 1973
- Philip Magnus, Kitchener 1958
- Keith Middlemas, The Life and Times of Edward VII, 1972
- George Plumptre, Edward VII, 1995
- Andrew Roberts, Salisbury: Victorian Titan Weidenfeld & Nicolson, 1999, ISBN 0-75381-091-3
- John Evelyn Wrench, Alfred Milner: The Man of No Illusions 1958

=== Secondary sources ===
- Darrell Bates, The Fashoda Incident, 1898
- R G Brown, Fashoda Reconsidered, 1969
- Edward T Cook, The Rights and Wrongs of the Transvaal War, 1901
- Earl of Cromer, Modern Egypt, 2 vols, 1908
- Brian Gardner, Mafeking: The Making of a Victorian legend, 1966
- C.F Goodfellow, The Making of South African Confederation 1870-81, 1966
- Angus Hamilton, The Siege of Mafeking, 1900
- D M Scheuder, The Scramble for Southern Africa 1877-95, 1980
- Edward Spiers, The Late Victorian Army, 1992

=== Articles ===
- Ahmad Rafiuddin, "The battle of Omdurman and the Mussulman World," Nineteenth century, vol.cclx, October 1898
- Keith Surridge, "The Military Critique of the South African War 1899-1902," History, October 1997
