= Robert Gascoyne-Cecil, 3rd Marquess of Salisbury =

British statesman (1830–1903)

The Most Honourable The Marquess of Salisbury KG GCVO PC DL FRS
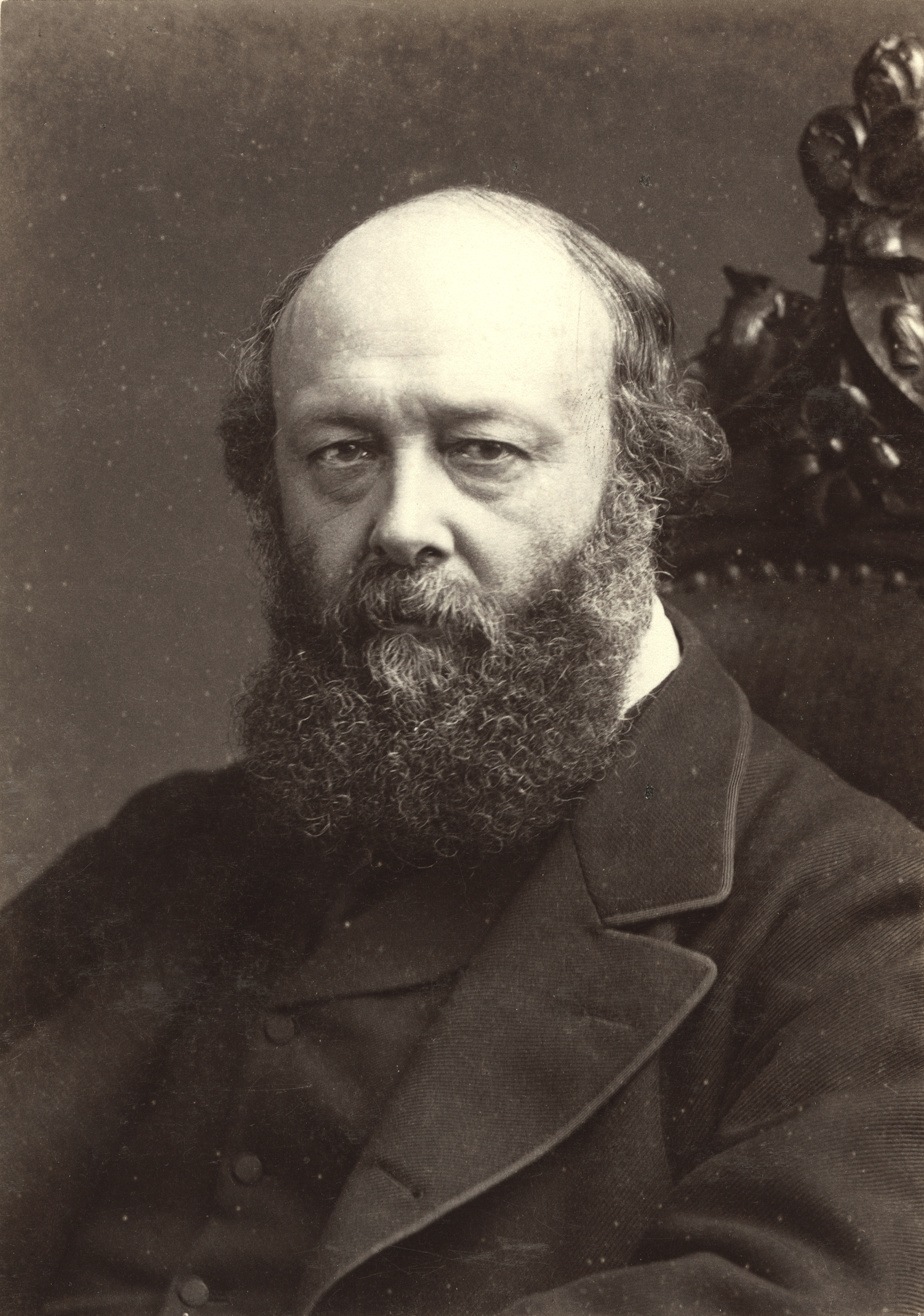
- Portrait, 1886

Prime Minister of the United Kingdom
- In office 25 June 1895 – 11 July 1902
- Monarchs: Victoria; Edward VII
- Preceded by: The Earl of Rosebery
- Succeeded by: Arthur Balfour
- In office 25 July 1886 – 11 August 1892
- Monarch: Victoria
- Preceded by: William Ewart Gladstone
- Succeeded by: William Ewart Gladstone
- In office 23 June 1885 – 28 January 1886
- Monarch: Victoria
- Preceded by: William Ewart Gladstone
- Succeeded by: William Ewart Gladstone
Ministerial positions
Lord Keeper of the Privy Seal
In office 12 November 1900 – 11 July 1902
Prime Minister	Himself
Preceded by	The Viscount Cross
Succeeded by	Arthur Balfour
Foreign Secretary
In office 29 June 1895 – 12 November 1900
Prime Minister	Himself
Preceded by	The Earl of Kimberley
Succeeded by	The Marquess of Lansdowne
In office 14 January 1887 – 11 August 1892
Prime Minister	Himself
Preceded by	The Earl of Iddesleigh
Succeeded by	The Earl of Rosebery
In office 24 June 1885 – 6 February 1886
Prime Minister	Himself
Preceded by	The Earl Granville
Succeeded by	The Earl of Rosebery
In office 2 April 1878 – 28 April 1880
Prime Minister	The Earl of Beaconsfield
Preceded by	The Earl of Derby
Succeeded by	The Earl Granville
Secretary of State for India
In office 21 February 1874 – 2 April 1878
Prime Minister	The Earl of Beaconsfield
Preceded by	The Duke of Argyll
Succeeded by	The Viscount Cranbrook
In office 6 July 1866 – 8 March 1867
Prime Minister	The Earl of Derby
Preceded by	The Earl de Grey
Succeeded by	Sir Stafford Northcote
Parliamentary offices
Leader of the Opposition
In office 11 August 1892 – 22 June 1895
Prime Minister	William Ewart Gladstone; The Earl of Rosebery
Preceded by	William Ewart Gladstone
Succeeded by	The Earl of Rosebery
In office 28 January 1886 – 20 July 1886
Prime Minister	William Ewart Gladstone
Preceded by	William Ewart Gladstone
Succeeded by	William Ewart Gladstone
In office May 1881 – 9 June 1885
Prime Minister	William Ewart Gladstone
Preceded by	The Earl of Beaconsfield
Succeeded by	William Ewart Gladstone
Member of the House of Lords
Lord Temporal
Hereditary peerage 12 April 1868 – 22 August 1903
Preceded by	The 2nd Marquess of Salisbury
Succeeded by	The 4th Marquess of Salisbury

Member of Parliament for Stamford
- In office 22 August 1853 – 12 April 1868
- Preceded by: John Charles Herries
- Succeeded by: Charles Chetwynd-Talbot

Personal details
- Born: 3 February 1830 Hatfield, Hertfordshire, England
- Died: 22 August 1903 (aged 73) Hatfield, Hertfordshire, England
- Resting place: St Etheldreda's Church, Hatfield
- Party: Conservative
- Spouse: Georgina Alderson (m. 1857; died 1899)
- Children: Maud, Countess of Selborne; Lady Gwendolen; James, 4th Marquess of Salisbury; William, Bishop of Exeter; Robert, 1st Viscount Cecil of Chelwood; Lord Edward; Hugh, 1st Baron Quickswood
- Parents: James Gascoyne-Cecil, 2nd Marquess of Salisbury (father); Frances Mary Gascoyne (mother)
- Education: Christ Church, Oxford
- Cabinet: I; II; III; IV

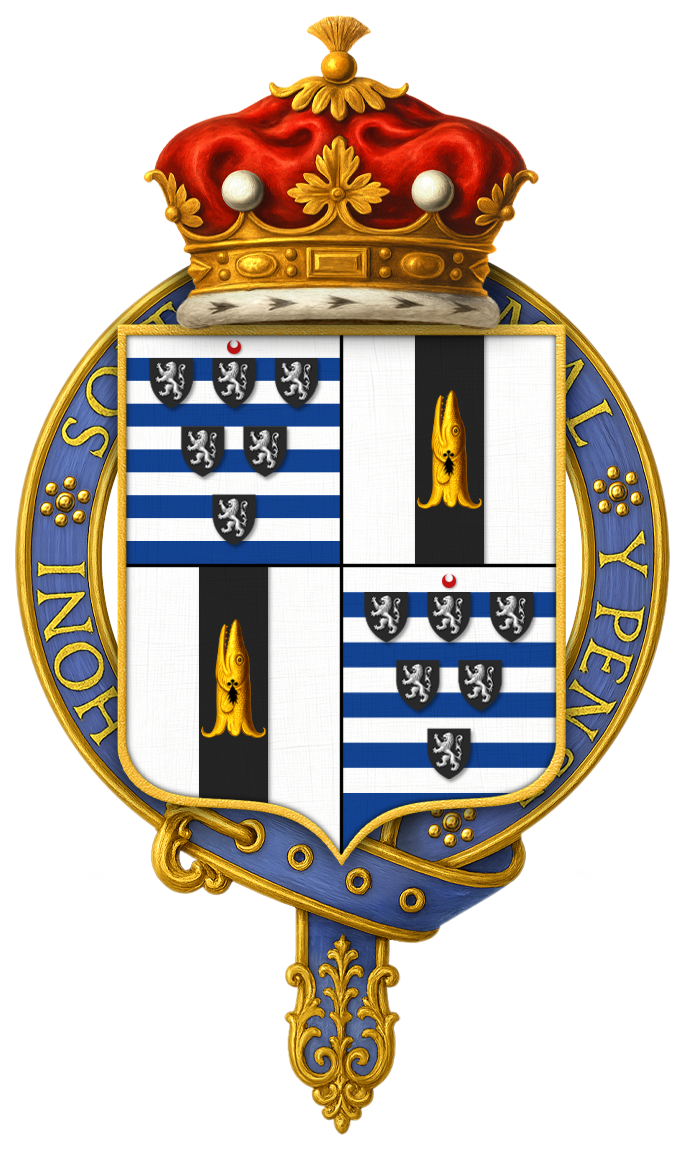
Garter-encircled arms of Robert Gascoyne-Cecil, 3rd Marquess of Salisbury, KG, GCVO, PC, FRS, DL

Robert Arthur Talbot Gascoyne-Cecil, 3rd Marquess of Salisbury (/ˈɡæskɔɪn ˈsɪsəl/ GASK-oyn SISS-əl; 3 February 1830 – 22 August 1903), (Note: He was styled Lord Robert Cecil before the death of his elder brother in 1865, Viscount Cranborne from June 1865 until his father died in April 1868, and subsequently Marquess of Salisbury.) known as Lord Salisbury, was a British statesman and Conservative politician who served as Prime Minister of the United Kingdom three times for a total of over thirteen years. He was also Foreign Secretary before and during most of his tenure. He avoided international alignments or alliances, maintaining the policy of "splendid isolation".

Lord Robert Cecil, later known as Lord Salisbury, was first elected to the House of Commons in 1854 and served as Secretary of State for India in Lord Derby's Conservative government 1866–1867. In 1874, under Disraeli, Salisbury returned as Secretary of State for India, and, in 1878, was appointed foreign secretary, and played a leading part in the Congress of Berlin. After Disraeli's death in 1881, Salisbury emerged as the Conservative leader in the House of Lords, with Sir Stafford Northcote leading the party in the Commons. He succeeded William Ewart Gladstone as prime minister in June 1885, and held the office until January 1886.

When Gladstone came out in favour of Home Rule for Ireland later that year, Salisbury opposed him and formed an alliance with the breakaway Liberal Unionists, winning the subsequent 1886 general election. His biggest achievement in this term was obtaining the majority of the new territory in Africa during the Scramble for Africa, avoiding a war or serious confrontation with the other powers. He remained as prime minister until Gladstone's Liberals formed a government with the support of the Irish nationalists at the 1892 general election. The Liberals, however, lost the 1895 general election, and Salisbury for the third and last time became prime minister. He led Britain to victory in a bitter, controversial war against the Boers, and led the Unionists to another electoral victory in 1900. He relinquished the premiership to his nephew Arthur Balfour in 1902 and died in 1903. He was the last prime minister to serve from the House of Lords throughout the entirety of their premiership. (Note: Alec Douglas-Home was very briefly a member of the House of Lords at the beginning of his premiership, but he renounced his peerage and subsequently sat in the House of Commons.)

Historians agree that Salisbury was a strong and effective leader in foreign affairs, with a wide grasp of the issues. Paul Smith characterises his personality as "deeply neurotic, depressive, agitated, introverted, fearful of change and loss of control, and self-effacing but capable of extraordinary competitiveness". A representative of the landed aristocracy, he held a reactionary credo: "Whatever happens will be for the worse, and therefore it is in our interest that as little should happen as possible." Searle says that instead of seeing his party's victory in 1886 as a harbinger of a new and more popular Conservatism, Salisbury longed to return to the stability of the past, when his party's main function was to restrain what he saw as demagogic liberalism and democratic excess. He is generally ranked in the upper tier of British prime ministers.

== Early life: 1830–1852 ==
Robert Arthur Talbot Gascoyne-Cecil was born on 3 February 1830 at Hatfield House, the third son of the 2nd Marquess of Salisbury and Frances Mary, née Gascoyne. He was a patrilineal descendant of Lord Burghley and the 1st Earl of Salisbury, chief ministers of Elizabeth I. The family-owned vast rural estates in Hertfordshire and Dorset. This wealth increased sharply in 1821, when his father married his mother, Frances Mary Gascoyne, heiress of a wealthy merchant and Member of Parliament who had bought large estates in Essex and Lancashire.

Robert had a miserable childhood, with few friends, and filled his time with reading. He was bullied unmercifully at the schools he attended. In 1840, he went to Eton College, where he did well in French, German, Classics, and Theology, but left in 1845 because of intense bullying. His unhappy schooling shaped his pessimistic outlook on life and his negative views on democracy. He decided that most people were cowardly and cruel, and that the mob would run roughshod over sensitive individuals.

In December 1847, he went to Christ Church, Oxford, where he received an honorary fourth class in Mathematics, conferred by nobleman's privilege due to ill health. Whilst at Oxford, he found the Oxford movement or "Tractarianism" to be an intoxicating force, and had an intense religious experience that shaped his life. He was involved in the Oxford Union, serving as its secretary and treasurer. In 1853, he was elected a prize fellow of All Souls College, Oxford.

In April 1850, he joined Lincoln's Inn, but did not enjoy law. His doctor advised him to travel for his health, and so, from July 1851 to May 1853, Cecil travelled through Cape Colony in southern Africa, Australia, including Tasmania, and New Zealand. He disliked the Boers and wrote that free institutions and self-government could not be granted to the Cape Colony because the Boers outnumbered the British three-to-one, and "it will simply be delivering us over bound hand and foot into the power of the Dutch, who hate us as much as a conquered people can hate their conquerors". He found the Kaffirs "a fine set of men – whose language bears traces of a very high former civilisation", similar to Italian. They were "an intellectual race, with great firmness and fixedness of will" but "horribly immoral" because they lacked theism.

At the Bendigo goldfields in Australia, he claimed that "there is not half as much crime or insubordination as there would be in an English town of the same wealth and population". Ten thousand miners were policed by four men armed with carbines and, at Mount Alexander, 30,000 people were protected by 200 policemen, with over 30,000 ounces (850,000 g) of gold mined per week. He believed that there was "generally far more civility than I should be likely to find in the good town of Hatfield" and claimed that was due to "the government was that of the Queen, not of the mob; from above, not from below. Holding from a supposed right (whether real or not, no matter)" and from "the People the source of all legitimate power," Cecil said of the Māori of New Zealand: "The natives seem when they have converted to make much better Christians than the white man". A Maori chief offered Cecil 5 acres (2 ha) near Auckland, which he declined.

== Member of Parliament: 1853–1866 ==
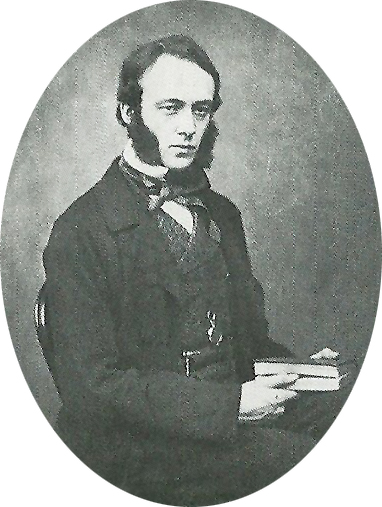
Cecil c. 1857

Cecil entered the House of Commons as a Conservative on 22 August 1853, as MP for Stamford in Lincolnshire. He retained this seat until he succeeded to his father's peerages in 1868 and it was not contested during his time as its representative. In his election address, he opposed secular education and "ultramontane" interference with the Church of England which was "at variance with the fundamental principles of our constitution". He would oppose "any such tampering with our representative system as shall disturb the reciprocal powers on which the stability of our constitution rests". In 1867, after his brother Eustace complained of being addressed by constituents in a hotel, Cecil responded: "A hotel infested by influential constituents is worse than one infested by bugs. It's a pity you can't carry around a powder insecticide to get rid of vermin of that kind".

In December 1856 Cecil began publishing articles for the Saturday Review, to which he contributed anonymously for the next nine years. From 1861 to 1864 he published 422 articles in it; in total the weekly published 608 of his articles. The Quarterly Review was the foremost conservative journal of the age and of the twenty-six issues published between spring 1860 and summer 1866, Cecil had anonymous articles in all but three of them. He also wrote lead articles for the Tory daily newspaper the Standard. In 1859 Cecil was a founding co-editor of Bentley's Quarterly Review, with John Douglas Cook and Rev. William Scott; but it closed after four issues.

Salisbury criticised the foreign policy of Lord John Russell, claiming he was "always being willing to sacrifice anything for peace... colleagues, principles, pledges... a portentous mixture of bounce and baseness... dauntless to the weak, timid and cringing to the strong". The lessons to be learnt from Russell's foreign policy, Salisbury believed, were that he should not listen to the opposition or the press otherwise "we are to be governed... by a set of weathercocks, delicately poised, warranted to indicate with unnerving accuracy every variation in public feeling". Secondly: "No one dreams of conducting national affairs with the principles which are prescribed to individuals. The meek and poor-spirited among nations are not to be blessed, and the common sense of Christendom has always prescribed for national policy principles diametrically opposed to those that are laid down in the Sermon on the Mount". Thirdly: "The assemblies that meet in Westminster have no jurisdiction over the affairs of other nations. Neither they nor the Executive, except in plain defiance of international law, can interfere [in the internal affairs of other countries]... It is not a dignified position for a Great Power to occupy, to be pointed out as the busybody of Christendom". Finally, Britain should not threaten other countries unless prepared to back this up by force: "A willingness to fight is the point d'appui of diplomacy, just as much as a readiness to go to court is the starting point of a lawyer's letter. It is merely courting dishonour, and inviting humiliation for the men of peace to use the habitual language of the men of war".

== Secretary of State for India: 1866–1867 ==
In 1866 Cecil, now known by the courtesy title Viscount Cranborne after the death of his brother, entered the third government of Lord Derby as Secretary of State for India. When in 1867 John Stuart Mill proposed a type of proportional representation, Cranborne argued that: "It was not of our atmosphere—it was not in accordance with our habits; it did not belong to us. They all knew that it could not pass. Whether that was creditable to the House or not was a question into which he would not inquire; but every Member of the House the moment he saw the scheme upon the Paper saw that it belonged to the class of impracticable things".

On 2 August when the Commons debated the Orissa famine in India, Cranborne spoke out against experts, political economy, and the government of Bengal. Utilising the Blue Books, Cranborne criticised officials for "walking in a dream... in superb unconsciousness, believing that what had been must be, and that as long as they did nothing absolutely wrong, and they did not displease their immediate superiors, they had fulfilled all the duties of their station". These officials worshipped political economy "as a sort of 'fetish'... [they] seemed to have forgotten utterly that human life was short, and that man did not subsist without food beyond a few days". Three-quarters of a million people had died because officials had chosen "to run the risk of losing the lives than to run the risk of wasting the money". Cranborne's speech was received with "an enthusiastic, hearty cheer from both sides of the House" and Mill crossed the floor of the Commons to congratulate him on it. The famine left Cranborne with a lifelong suspicion of experts and in the photograph albums at his home covering the years 1866–67 there are two images of skeletal Indian children amongst the family pictures.

=== Reform Act 1867 ===
When parliamentary reform came to prominence again in the mid-1860s, Cranborne worked hard to master electoral statistics until he became an expert. When the Liberal Reform Bill was being debated in 1866, Cranborne studied the census returns to see how each clause in the Bill would affect the electoral prospects in each seat. Cranborne did not expect Disraeli's conversion to reform, however. When the Cabinet met on 16 February 1867, Disraeli voiced his support for some extension of the suffrage, providing statistics amassed by Robert Dudley Baxter, showing that 330,000 people would be given the vote and all except 60,000 would be granted extra votes.

Cranborne studied Baxter's statistics and on 21 February he met Lord Carnarvon, who wrote in his diary: "He is firmly convinced now that Disraeli has played us false, that he is attempting to hustle us into his measure, that Lord Derby is in his hands and that the present form which the question has now assumed has been long planned by him". They agreed to "a sort of offensive and defensive alliance on this question in the Cabinet" to "prevent the Cabinet adopting any very fatal course". Disraeli had "separate and confidential conversations...carried on with each member of the Cabinet from whom he anticipated opposition [which] had divided them and lulled their suspicions". That same night Cranborne spent three hours studying Baxter's statistics and wrote to Carnarvon the day after that although Baxter was right overall in claiming that 30% of £10 ratepayers who qualified for the vote would not register, it would be untrue in relation to the smaller boroughs where the register is kept up to date. Cranborne also wrote to Derby arguing that he should adopt 10 shillings rather than Disraeli's 20 shillings for the qualification of the payers of direct taxation: "Now above 10 shillings you won't get in the large mass of the £20 householders. At 20 shillings I fear you won't get more than 150,000 double voters, instead of the 270,000 on which we counted. And I fear this will tell horribly on the small and middle-sized boroughs".

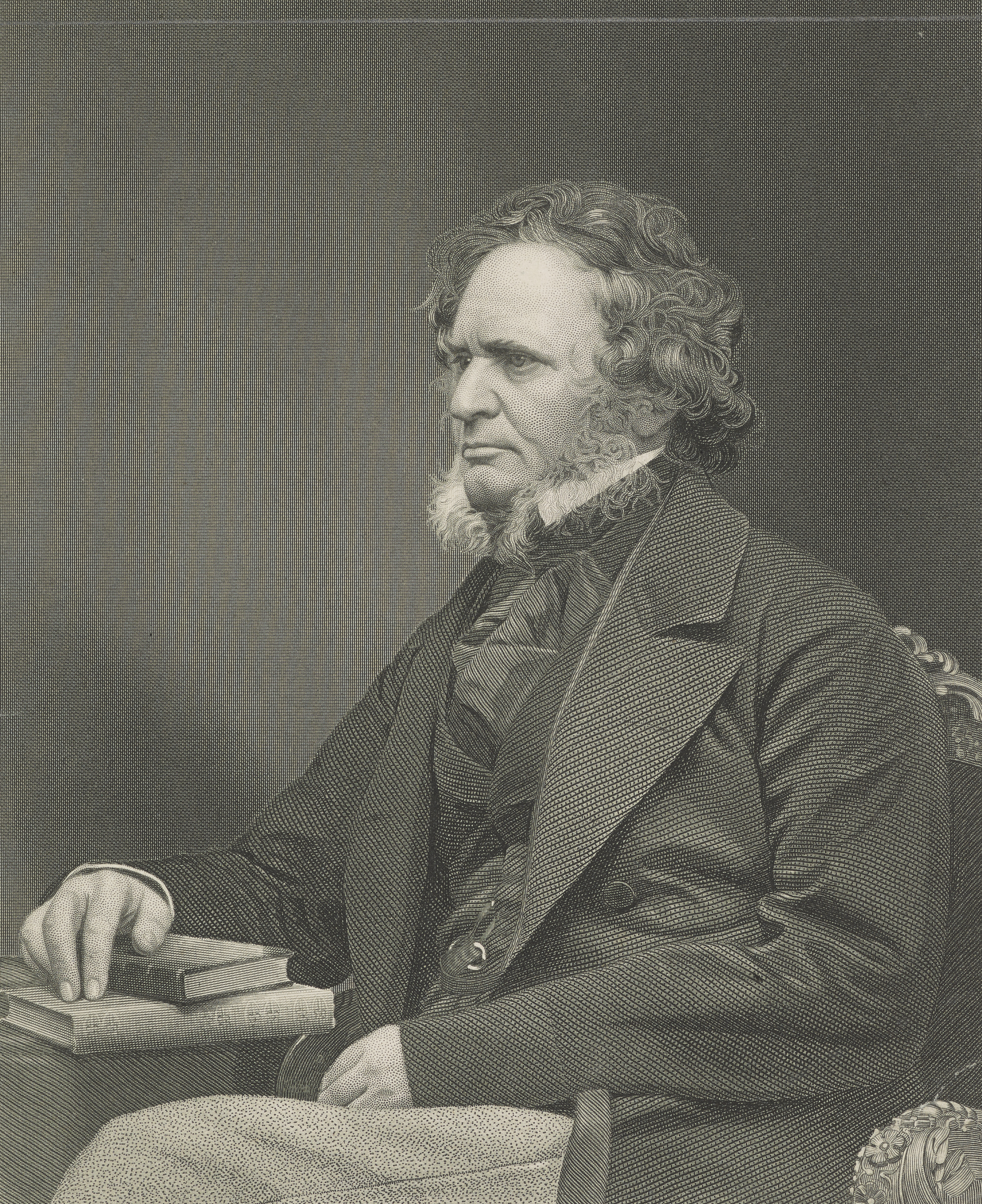
Lord Derby. Salisbury resigned from his government in protest against proposals for parliamentary reform.

On 23 February Cranborne protested in Cabinet and the next day analysed Baxter's figures using census returns and other statistics to determine how Disraeli's planned extension of the franchise would affect subsequent elections. Cranborne found that Baxter had not taken into account the different types of boroughs in the totals of new voters. In small boroughs under 20,000 the "fancy franchises" for direct taxpayers and dual voters would be less than the new working-class voters in each seat.

The same day he met Carnarvon and they both studied the figures, coming to the same result each time: "A complete revolution would be effected in the boroughs" due to the new majority of the working-class electorate. Cranborne wanted to send his resignation to Derby along with the statistics but Cranborne agreed to Carnarvon's suggestion that as a Cabinet member he had a right to call a Cabinet meeting. It was planned for the next day, 25 February. Cranborne wrote to Derby that he had discovered that Disraeli's plan would "throw the small boroughs almost, and many of them entirely, into the hands of the voter whose qualification is less than £10. I do not think that such a proceeding is for the interest of the country. I am sure that it is not in accordance with the hopes which those of us who took an active part in resisting Mr Gladstone's Bill last year in those whom we induced to vote for us". The Conservative boroughs with populations less than 25,000 (a majority of the boroughs in Parliament) would be very much worse off under Disraeli's scheme than the Liberal Reform Bill of the previous year: "But if I assented to this scheme, now that I know what its effect will be, I could not look in the face those whom last year I urged to resist Mr Gladstone. I am convinced that it will, if passed, be the ruin of the Conservative party".

When Cranborne entered the Cabinet meeting on 25 February "with reams of paper in his hands" he began by reading statistics but was interrupted to be told of the proposal by Lord Stanley that they should agree to a £6 borough rating franchise instead of the full household suffrage, and a £20 county franchise rather than £50. The Cabinet agreed to Stanley's proposal. The meeting was so contentious that a minister who was late initially thought they were debating the suspension of habeas corpus. The next day another Cabinet meeting took place, with Cranborne saying little and the Cabinet adopting Disraeli's proposal to bring in a Bill in a week's time. On 28 February a meeting of the Carlton Club took place, with a majority of the 150 Conservative MPs present supporting Derby and Disraeli. At the Cabinet meeting on 2 March, Cranborne, Carnarvon and General Peel were pleaded with for two hours not to resign, but when Cranborne "announced his intention of resigning...Peel and Carnarvon, with evident reluctance, followed his example". Lord John Manners observed that Cranborne "remained unmoveable". Derby closed his red box with a sigh and stood up, saying "The Party is ruined!" Cranborne got up at the same time, with Peel remarking: "Lord Cranborne, do you hear what Lord Derby says?" Cranborne ignored this and the three resigning ministers left the room. Cranborne's resignation speech was met with loud cheers and Carnarvon observed that it was "moderate and in good taste – a sufficient justification for us who seceded and yet no disclosure of the frequent changes in policy in the Cabinet".

Disraeli introduced his Bill on 18 March and it would extend the suffrage to all rate-paying householders of two years' residence, dual voting for graduates or those of a learned profession, or those with £50 in government funds or in the Bank of England or a savings bank. These "fancy franchises", as Cranborne had foreseen, did not survive the Bill's course through Parliament; dual voting was dropped in March, the compound householder vote in April; and the residential qualification was reduced in May. In the end the county franchise was granted to householders rated at £12 annually. On 15 July the third reading of the Bill took place and Cranborne spoke first, in a speech which his biographer Andrew Roberts has called "possibly the greatest oration of a career full of powerful parliamentary speeches". Cranborne observed how the Bill "bristled with precautions, guarantees and securities" had been stripped of these. He attacked Disraeli by pointing out how he had campaigned against the Liberal Bill in 1866 yet the next year introduced a Bill more extensive than the one rejected. In the peroration, Cranborne said:

I desire to protest, in the most earnest language which I am capable of using, against the political morality on which the manoeuvres of this year have been based. If you borrow your political ethics from the ethics of the political adventurer, you may depend upon it the whole of your representative institutions will crumble beneath your feet. It is only because of that mutual trust in each other by which we ought to be animated, it is only because we believe that expressions and convictions expressed, and promises made, will be followed by deeds, that we are enabled to carry on this party Government which has led this country to so high a pitch of greatness. I entreat honourable Gentlemen opposite not to believe that my feelings on this subject are dictated simply by my hostility on this particular measure, though I object to it most strongly, as the House is aware. But, even if I took a contrary view – if I deemed it to be most advantageous, I still should deeply regret that the position of the Executive should have been so degraded as it has been in the present session: I should deeply regret to find that the House of Commons has applauded a policy of legerdemain; and I should, above all things, regret that this great gift to the people – if gift you think – should have been purchased at the cost of a political betrayal which has no parallel in our Parliamentary annals, which strikes at the root of all that mutual confidence which is the very soul of our party Government, and on which only the strength and freedom of our representative institutions can be sustained.

In his article for the October Quarterly Review, entitled 'The Conservative Surrender', Cranborne criticised Derby because he had "obtained the votes which placed him in office on the faith of opinions which, to keep office, he immediately repudiated...He made up his mind to desert these opinions at the very moment he was being raised to power as their champion". Also, the annals of modern parliamentary history could find no parallel for Disraeli's betrayal; historians would have to look "to the days when Sunderland directed the Council, and accepted the favours of James when he was negotiating the invasion of William". Disraeli responded in a speech that Cranborne was "a very clever man who has made a very great mistake".

== In opposition: 1868–1874 ==
In 1868, on the death of his father, he inherited the Marquessate of Salisbury, thereby becoming a member of the House of Lords. In addition to the titles, he inherited 20,000 acres with 13,000 of these in Hertfordshire. In 1869 he was elected Chancellor of the University of Oxford and elected a Fellow of the Royal Society. Between 1868 and 1871, he was chairman of the Great Eastern Railway, which was then experiencing losses. During his tenure, the company was taken out of Chancery, and paid out a small dividend on its ordinary shares.

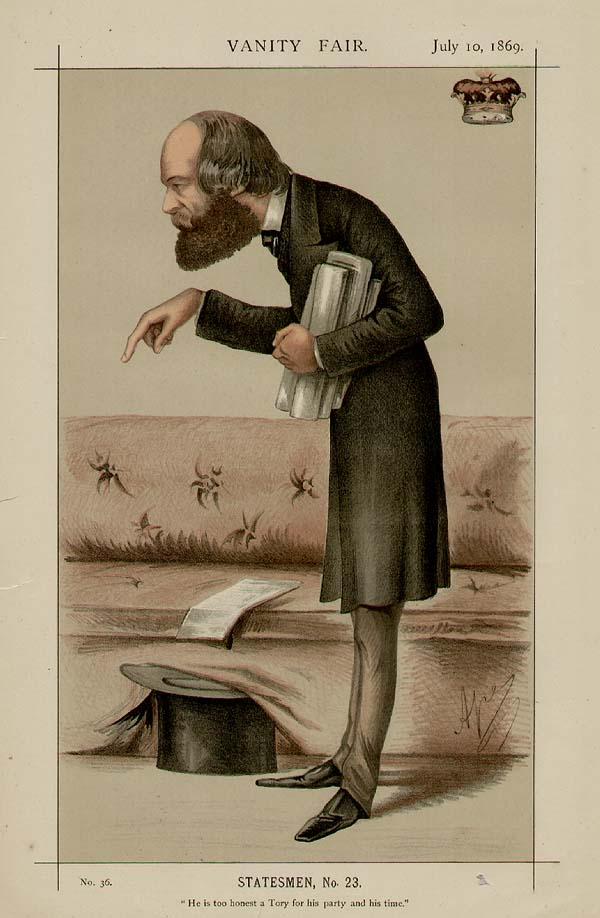
The Marquess of Salisbury caricatured by "Ape" (Carlo Pellegrini) in Vanity Fair, 1869

From 1868 he was Honorary Colonel of the Hertfordshire Militia, which became the 4th (Militia) Battalion, Bedfordshire Regiment, in 1881, and which was commanded in South Africa during the Second Boer War by his eldest son.

== Secretary of State for India: 1874–1878 ==
Salisbury returned to government in 1874, serving once again as Secretary of State for India in the government of Benjamin Disraeli, and Britain's Ambassador Plenipotentiary at the 1876 Constantinople Conference. Salisbury gradually developed a good relationship with Disraeli, whom he had previously disliked and mistrusted.

During a Cabinet meeting on 7 March 1878, a discussion arose over whether to occupy Mytilene. Lord Derby recorded in his diary that "[o]f all present Salisbury by far the most eager for action: he talked of our sliding into a position of contempt: of our being humiliated etc." At the Cabinet meeting the next day, Derby recorded that Lord John Manners objected to occupying the city "on the ground of right. Salisbury treated scruples of this kind with marked contempt, saying, truly enough, that if our ancestors had cared for the rights of other people, the British empire would not have been made. He was more vehement than any one for going on. In the end the project was dropped..."

== Foreign Secretary: 1878–1880 ==
In 1878, Salisbury became foreign secretary in time to help lead Britain to "peace with honour" at the Congress of Berlin. For this, he was rewarded with the Order of the Garter along with Disraeli.

== Leader of the Opposition: 1881–1885 ==
Following Disraeli's death in 1881, the Conservatives entered a period of turmoil. The party's previous leaders had all been appointed as prime minister by the reigning monarch on advice from their retiring predecessor, and no process was in place to deal with leadership succession in case either the leadership became vacant while the party was in opposition, or the outgoing leader died without designating a successor, situations which both arose from the death of Disraeli (a formal leadership election system would not be adopted by the party until 1964, shortly after the government of Alec Douglas-Home fell). Salisbury became the leader of the Conservative members of the House of Lords, though the overall leadership of the party was not formally allocated. So he struggled with the Commons leader Sir Stafford Northcote, a struggle in which Salisbury eventually emerged as the leading figure. Historian Richard Shannon argues that while Salisbury presided over one of the longest periods of Tory dominance, he misinterpreted and mishandled his election successes. Salisbury's blindness to the middle class and reliance on the aristocracy prevented the Conservatives from becoming a majority party.

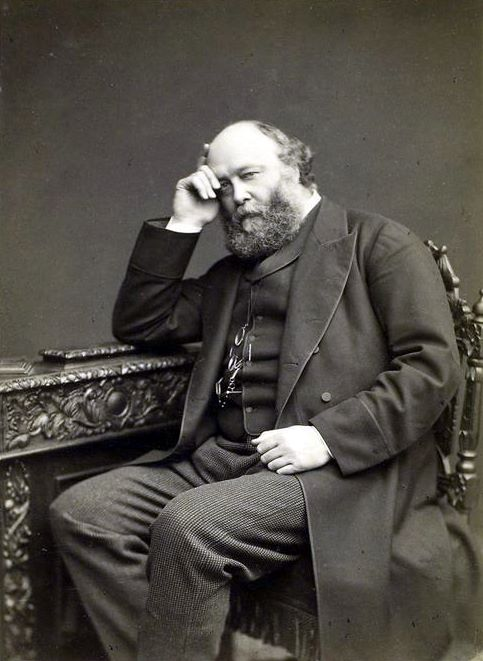
Lord Salisbury, 1886

=== Reform Act 1884 ===
In 1884 Gladstone introduced a Reform Bill which would extend the suffrage to two million rural workers. Salisbury and Northcote agreed that any Reform Bill would be supported only if a parallel redistributionary measure was introduced as well. In a speech in the Lords, Salisbury claimed: "Now that the people have in no real sense been consulted, when they had, at the last General Election, no notion of what was coming upon them, I feel that we are bound, as guardians of their interests, to call upon the government to appeal to the people, and by the result of that appeal we will abide". The Lords rejected the Bill and Parliament was prorogued for ten weeks. Writing to Canon Malcolm MacColl, Salisbury believed that Gladstone's proposals for reform without redistribution would mean "the absolute effacement of the Conservative Party. It would not have reappeared as a political force for thirty years. This conviction...greatly simplified for me the computation of risks". At a meeting of the Carlton Club on 15 July, Salisbury announced his plan for making the government introduce a Seats (or Redistribution) Bill in the Commons whilst at the same time delaying a Franchise Bill in the Lords. The unspoken implication being that Salisbury would relinquish the party leadership if his plan was not supported. Although there was some dissent, Salisbury carried the party with him.

Salisbury wrote to Lady John Manners on 14 June that he did not regard female suffrage as a question of high importance "but when I am told that my ploughmen are capable citizens, it seems to me ridiculous to say that educated women are not just as capable. A good deal of the political battle of the future will be a conflict between religion and unbelief: & the women will in that controversy be on the right side".

On 21 July, a large meeting for reform was held at Hyde Park. Salisbury said in The Times that "the employment of mobs as an instrument of public policy is likely to prove a sinister precedent". On 23 July at Sheffield, Salisbury said that the government "imagine that thirty thousand Radicals going to amuse themselves in London on a given day expresses the public opinion of the day...they appeal to the streets, they attempt legislation by picnic". Salisbury further claimed that Gladstone adopted reform as a "cry" to deflect attention from his foreign and economic policies at the next election. He claimed that the House of Lords was protecting the British constitution: "I do not care whether it is an hereditary chamber or any other – to see that the representative chamber does not alter the tenure of its own power so as to give a perpetual lease of that power to the party in predominance at the moment".

On 25 July at a reform meeting in Leicester consisting of 40,000 people, Salisbury was burnt in effigy and a banner quoted Shakespeare's Henry VI: "Old Salisbury – shame to thy silver hair, Thou mad misleader". On 9 August in Manchester, over 100,000 came to hear Salisbury speak. On 30 September at Glasgow, he said: "We wish that the franchise should pass but that before you make new voters you should determine the constitution in which they are to vote". Salisbury published an article in the National Review for October, titled 'The Value of Redistribution: A Note on Electoral Statistics'. He claimed that the Conservatives "have no cause, for Party reasons, to dread enfranchisement coupled with a fair redistribution". Judging by the 1880 results, Salisbury asserted that the overall loss to the Conservatives of enfranchisement without redistribution would be 47 seats. Salisbury spoke throughout Scotland and claimed that the government had no mandate for reform when it had not appealed to the people.

Gladstone offered wavering Conservatives a compromise a little short of enfranchisement and redistribution, and after the Queen unsuccessfully attempted to persuade Salisbury to compromise, he wrote to Rev. James Baker on 30 October: "Politics stand alone among human pursuits in this characteristic, that no one is conscious of liking them – and no one is able to leave them. But whatever affection they may have had they are rapidly losing. The difference between now and thirty years ago when I entered the House of Commons is inconceivable".

On 11 November, the Franchise Bill received its third reading in the Commons and it was due to get a second reading in the Lords. The day after at a meeting of Conservative leaders, Salisbury was outnumbered in his opposition to compromise. On 13 February, Salisbury rejected MacColl's idea that he should meet Gladstone, as he believed the meeting would be found out and that Gladstone had no genuine desire to negotiate. On 17 November, it was reported in the newspapers that if the Conservatives gave "adequate assurance" that the Franchise Bill would pass the Lords before Christmas the government would ensure that a parallel Seats Bill would receive its second reading in the Commons as the Franchise Bill went into committee stage in the Lords. Salisbury responded by agreeing only if the Franchise Bill came second. The Carlton Club met to discuss the situation, with Salisbury's daughter writing:

The three arch-funkers Cairns, Richmond and Carnarvon cried out declaring that he would accept no compromise at all as it was absurd to imagine the Government conceding it. When the discussion was at its height (very high) enter Arthur [Balfour] with explicit declamation dictated by GOM in Hartington's handwriting yielding the point entirely. Tableau and triumph along the line for the "stiff" policy which had obtained terms which the funkers had not dared hope for. My father's prevailing sentiment is one of complete wonder...we have got all and more than we demanded.

Despite the controversy which had raged, the meetings of leading Liberals and Conservatives on reform at Downing Street were amicable. Salisbury and the Liberal Sir Charles Dilke dominated discussions as they had both closely studied in detail the effects of reform on the constituencies. After one of the last meetings on 26 November, Gladstone told his secretary that "Lord Salisbury, who seems to monopolise all the say on his side, has no respect for tradition. As compared with him, Mr Gladstone declares he is himself quite a Conservative. They got rid of the boundary question, minority representation, grouping and the Irish difficulty. The question was reduced to... for or against single member constituencies". The Reform Bill laid down that the majority of the 670 constituencies were to be roughly equal in size and return one member; those between 50,000 and 165,000 kept the two-member representation and those over 165,000 and all the counties were split up into single-member constituencies. This franchise existed until 1918.

== Prime minister: 1885–1892 ==
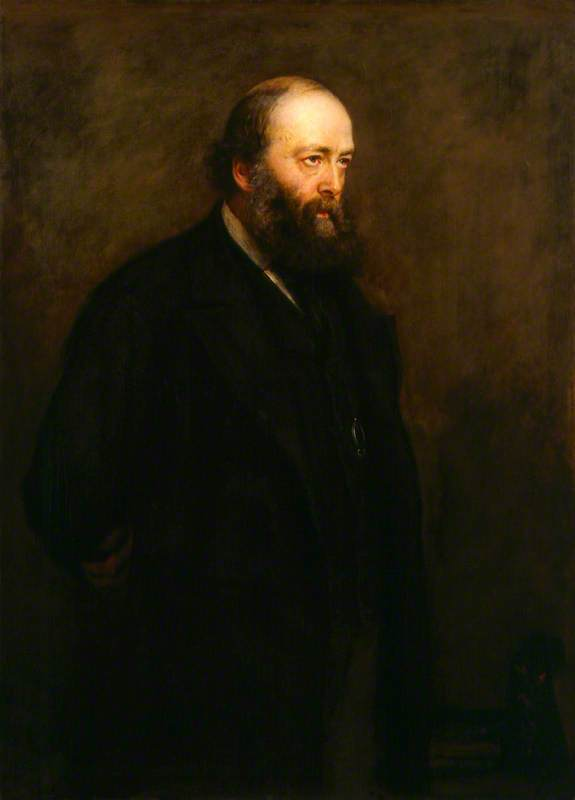
Portrait of the Marquess of Salisbury by John Everett Millais, 1883

=== First term: 1885–1886 ===
==== Appointment ====
Salisbury became prime minister of a minority administration from 1885 to 1886. In the November 1883 issue of National Review Salisbury wrote an article titled "Labourers' and Artisans' Dwellings" in which he argued that the poor conditions of working-class housing were injurious to morality and health. Salisbury said "Laissez-faire is an admirable doctrine but it must be applied on both sides", as Parliament had enacted new building projects (such as the Thames Embankment) which had displaced working-class people and was responsible for "packing the people tighter": "...thousands of families have only a single room to dwell in, where they sleep and eat, multiply, and die... It is difficult to exaggerate the misery which such conditions of life must cause, or the impulse they must give to vice. The depression of body and mind which they create is an almost insuperable obstacle to the action of any elevating or refining agencies". The Pall Mall Gazette argued that Salisbury had sailed into "the turbid waters of State Socialism"; the Manchester Guardian said his article was "State socialism pure and simple" and The Times claimed Salisbury was "in favour of state socialism".

==== Early reforms and parliamentary majority ====
In July 1885 the Housing of the Working Classes Bill was introduced by the Home Secretary, R. A. Cross in the Commons and Salisbury in the Lords. When Lord Wemyss criticised the Bill as "strangling the spirit of independence and the self-reliance of the people, and destroying the moral fibre of our race in the anaconda coils of state socialism", Salisbury responded: "Do not imagine that by merely affixing to it the reproach of Socialism you can seriously affect the progress of any great legislative movement, or destroy those high arguments which are derived from the noblest principles of philanthropy and religion". The Bill ultimately passed and came into effect on 14 August 1885.

Although unable to accomplish much due to his lack of a parliamentary majority, the split of the Liberals over Irish Home Rule in 1886 enabled him to return to power with a majority, and, excepting a Liberal minority government (1892–95), to serve as prime minister from 1886 to 1902.

=== Second term: 1886–1892 ===
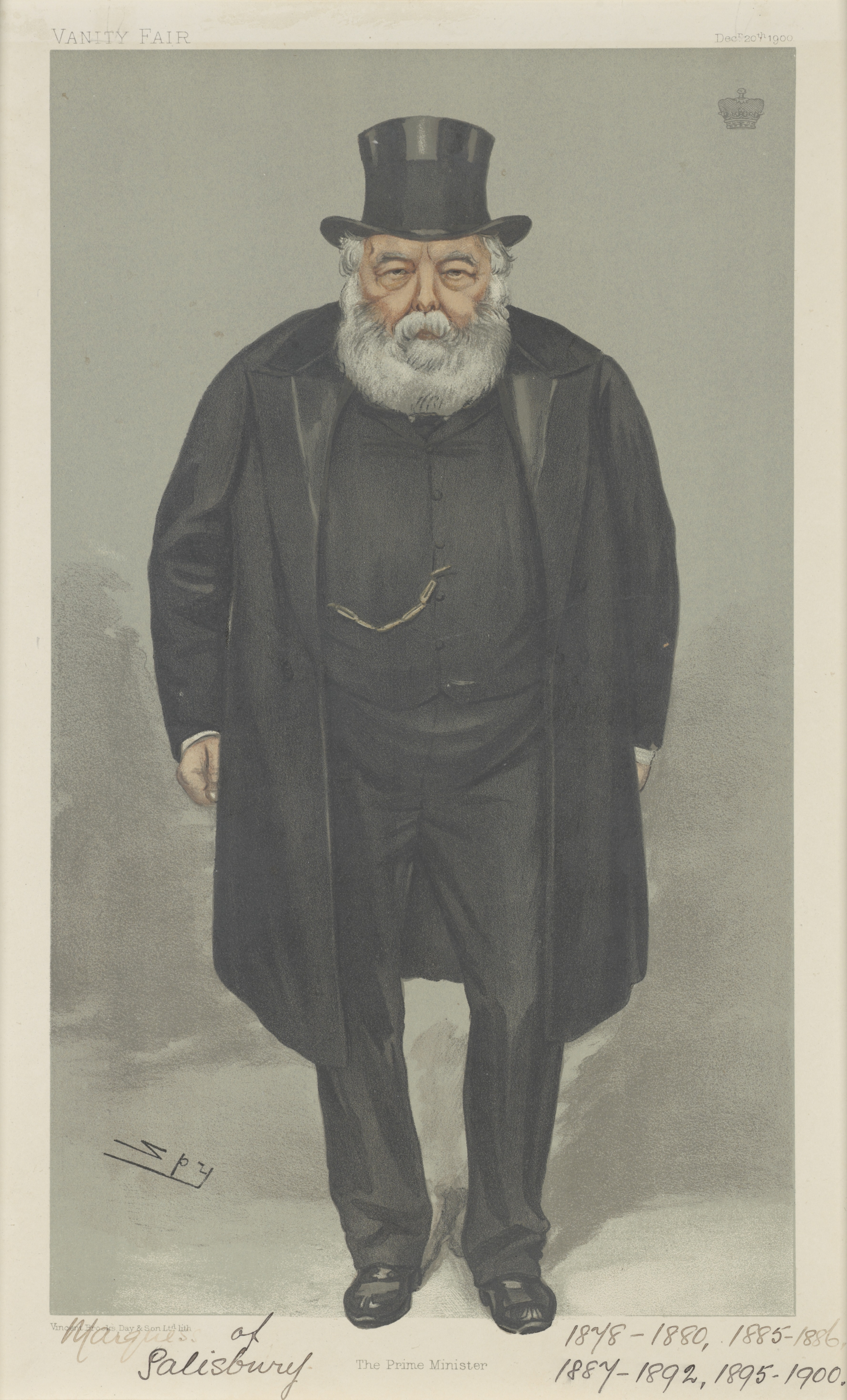
Salisbury caricatured by "Spy" for Vanity Fair, 1900

Salisbury was back in office, although without a conservative majority; he depended on the Liberal Unionists, led by Lord Hartington. Maintaining the alliance forced Salisbury to make concessions in support of progressive legislation regarding Irish land purchases, education, and county councils. His nephew Arthur Balfour acquired a strong reputation for resolute coercion in Ireland, and was promoted to leadership in the Commons in 1891. The Prime Minister proved adept at his handling of the press, as Sir Edward Walter Hamilton noted in his diary in 1887 he was: "the prime minister most accessible to the press. He is not prone to give information: but when he does, he gives it freely, & his information can always be relied on."

==== Foreign policy ====
Salisbury once again kept the foreign office (from January 1887), and his diplomacy continued to display a high level of skill, avoiding the extremes of Gladstone on the left and Disraeli on the right. His policy rejected entangling alliances–which at the time and ever since has been called "splendid isolation". He was successful in negotiating differences over colonial claims with France and others. The major problems were in the Mediterranean, where British interests had been involved for a century. It was now especially important to protect the Suez Canal and the sea lanes to India and Asia. He ended Britain's isolation through the Mediterranean Agreements (March and December 1887) with Italy and Austria-Hungary. He saw the need for maintaining control of the seas and passed the Naval Defence Act 1889, which facilitated the spending of an extra £20 million on the Royal Navy over the following four years. This was the biggest ever expansion of the navy in peacetime: ten new battleships, thirty-eight new cruisers, eighteen new torpedo boats and four new fast gunboats. Traditionally (since the Battle of Trafalgar) Britain had possessed a navy one-third larger than their nearest naval rival but now the Royal Navy was set to the two-power standard; that it would be maintained "to a standard of strength equivalent to that of the combined forces of the next two biggest navies in the world". This was aimed at France and Russia.

Salisbury was offered a dukedom by Queen Victoria in 1886 and 1892, but declined both offers, citing the prohibitive cost of the lifestyle dukes were expected to maintain and stating that he would rather have an ancient marquessate than a modern dukedom.

===== 1890 Ultimatum on Portugal =====
Trouble arose with Portugal, which had overextended itself in building a colonial empire in Africa it could ill afford. There was a clash of colonial visions between Portugal (the "Pink Map", produced by the Lisbon Geographic Society after Alexandre de Serpa Pinto's, Hermenegildo Capelo's and Roberto Ivens's expeditions to Africa) and the British Empire (Cecil Rhodes's "Cape to Cairo Railway") which came after years of diplomatic conflict about several African territories with Portugal and other powers. Portugal, financially hard-pressed, had to abandon several territories corresponding to today's Malawi, Zambia and Zimbabwe in favour of the Empire.

==== Domestic policy ====
In 1889 Salisbury set up the London County Council and then in 1890 allowed it to build houses. However, he came to regret this, saying in November 1894 that the LCC, "is the place where collectivist and socialistic experiments are tried. It is the place where a new revolutionary spirit finds its instruments and collects its arms".

===== Controversies =====
Salisbury caused controversy in 1888 after Gainsford Bruce had won the Holborn by-election for the Unionists, beating the Liberal Lord Compton. Bruce had won the seat with a smaller majority than Francis Duncan had for the Unionists in 1885. Salisbury explained this by saying in a speech in Edinburgh on 30 November:

But then Colonel Duncan was opposed to a black man, and, however great the progress of mankind has been, and however far we have advanced in overcoming prejudices, I doubt if we have yet got to the point where a British constituency will elect a black man to represent them.... I am speaking roughly and using language in its colloquial sense, because I imagine the colour is not exactly black, but at all events, he was a man of another race.

The "black man" was Dadabhai Naoroji, an Indian Parsi. Salisbury's comments were criticised by the Queen and by Liberals who believed that Salisbury had suggested that only white Britons could represent a British constituency. Three weeks later, Salisbury delivered a speech at Scarborough, where he denied that "the word "black" necessarily implies any contemptuous denunciation: "Such a doctrine seems to be a scathing insult to a very large proportion of the human race... The people whom we have been fighting at Suakin, and whom we have happily conquered, are among the finest tribes in the world, and many of them are as black as my hat". Furthermore, "such candidatures are incongruous and unwise. The British House of Commons, with its traditions... is a machine too peculiar and too delicate to be managed by any but those who have been born within these isles". Naoroji was elected for Finsbury in 1892 and Salisbury invited him to become a Governor of the Imperial Institute, which he accepted. In 1888, the New York Times published an article that was extremely critical of Lord Salisbury's remark. It included the following quotation, "Of course the parsees are not black men, but the purest Aryan type in existence, with an average complexion fairer than Lord Salisbury's; but even if they were ebony hued it would be grotesque and foolish for a Prime Minister of England to insult them in such a wanton fashion as this."

Documents in the Foreign Office archives revealed that Salisbury was made aware of a rape in 1891 and other atrocities carried out against women and children in the Niger Delta by Consul George Annesley and his soldiers but took no action against Annesley, who was "quietly pensioned off."

== Leader of the Opposition: 1892–1895 ==
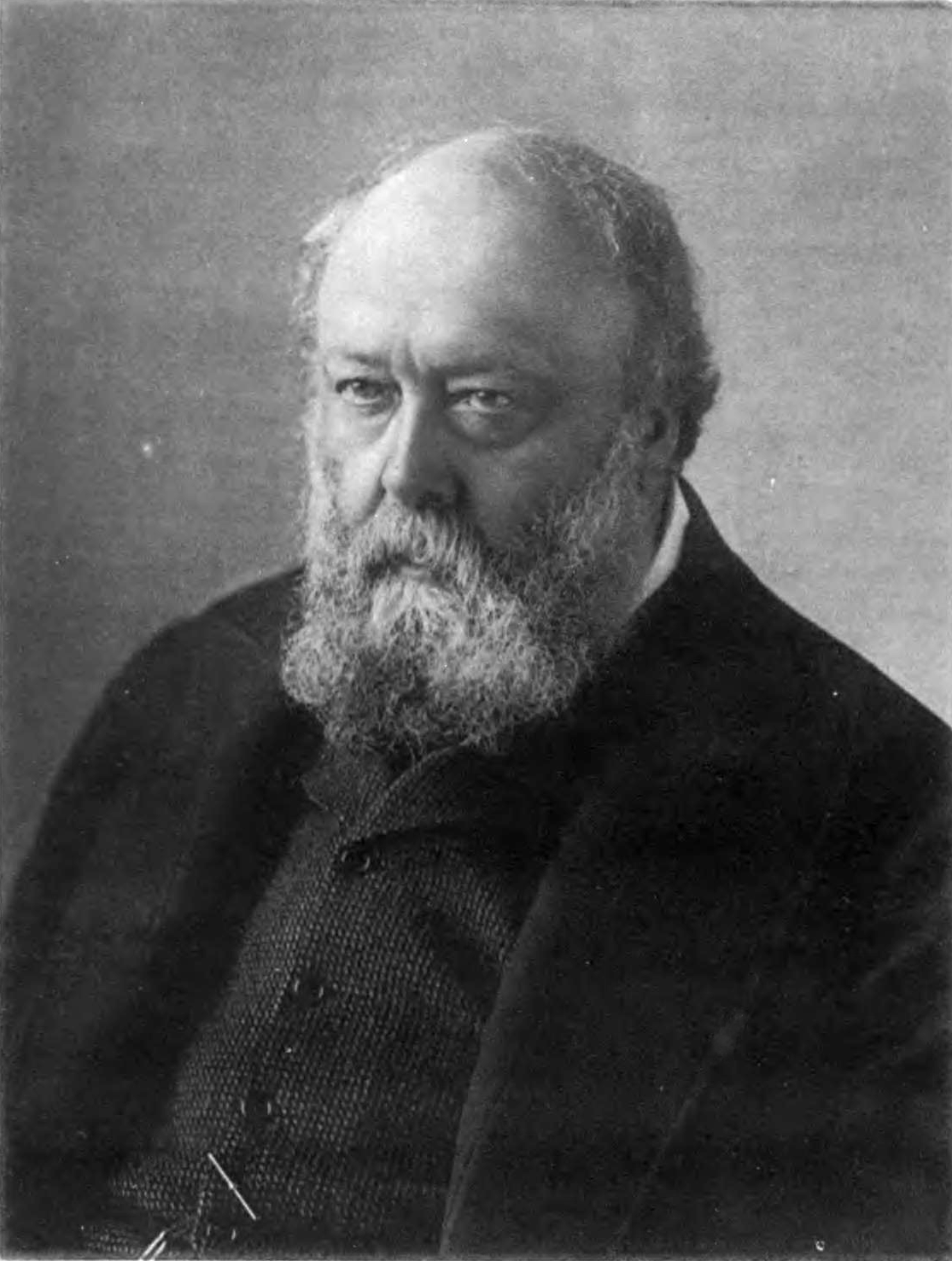
Salisbury photographed in 1893

In the aftermath of the general election of 1892, Balfour and Chamberlain wished to pursue a programme of social reform, which Salisbury believed would alienate "a good many people who have always been with us" and that "these social questions are destined to break up our party". When the Liberals and Irish Nationalists (which were a majority in the new Parliament) successfully voted against the government, Salisbury resigned the premiership on 12 August. His private secretary at the Foreign Office wrote that Salisbury "shewed indecent joy at his release".

Salisbury—in an article in November for the National Review entitled 'Constitutional revision'—said that the new government, lacking a majority in England and Scotland, had no mandate for Home Rule and argued that because there was no referendum only the House of Lords could provide the necessary consultation with the nation on policies for organic change. The Lords defeated the second Home Rule Bill by 419 to 41 in September 1893, but Salisbury stopped them from opposing the Liberal Chancellor's death duties in 1894. In 1894 Salisbury also became president of the British Association for the Advancement of Science, presenting a notable inaugural address on 4 August of that year. The general election of 1895 returned a large Unionist majority.

== Prime minister: 1895–1902 ==
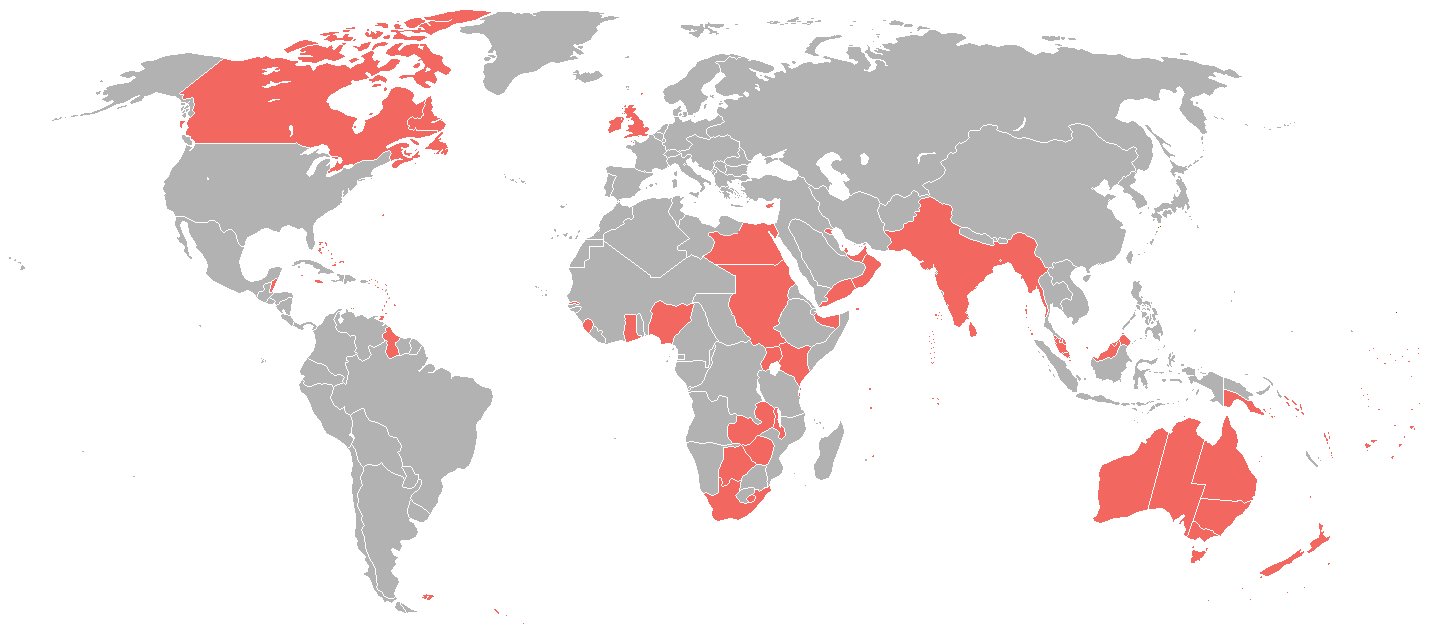
The British Empire in 1898

Salisbury's expertise was in foreign affairs. For most of his time as prime minister, he served not as First Lord of the Treasury, the traditional position held by the prime minister, but as foreign secretary. (Note: After Salisbury's retirement in 1902, all British prime ministers have also been First Lord of the Treasury.) In that capacity, he managed Britain's foreign affairs, but he was being sarcastic about a policy of "Splendid isolation"—such was not his goal.

=== Foreign policy ===
In foreign affairs, Salisbury was challenged worldwide. The long-standing policy of "Splendid isolation" had left Britain with no allies and few friends. In Europe, Germany was worrisome regarding its growing industrial and naval power, Kaiser Wilhelm's erratic foreign policy, and the instability caused by the decline of the Ottoman Empire. France was threatening British control of Sudan. In the Americas, for domestic political reasons, U.S. President Grover Cleveland manufactured a quarrel over Venezuela's border with British Guiana. In South Africa, conflict was threatening with the two Boer republics. In the Great Game in Central Asia, the line that separated Russia and British India in 1800 was narrowing. In China, the British economic dominance was threatened by other powers that wanted to control slices of China.

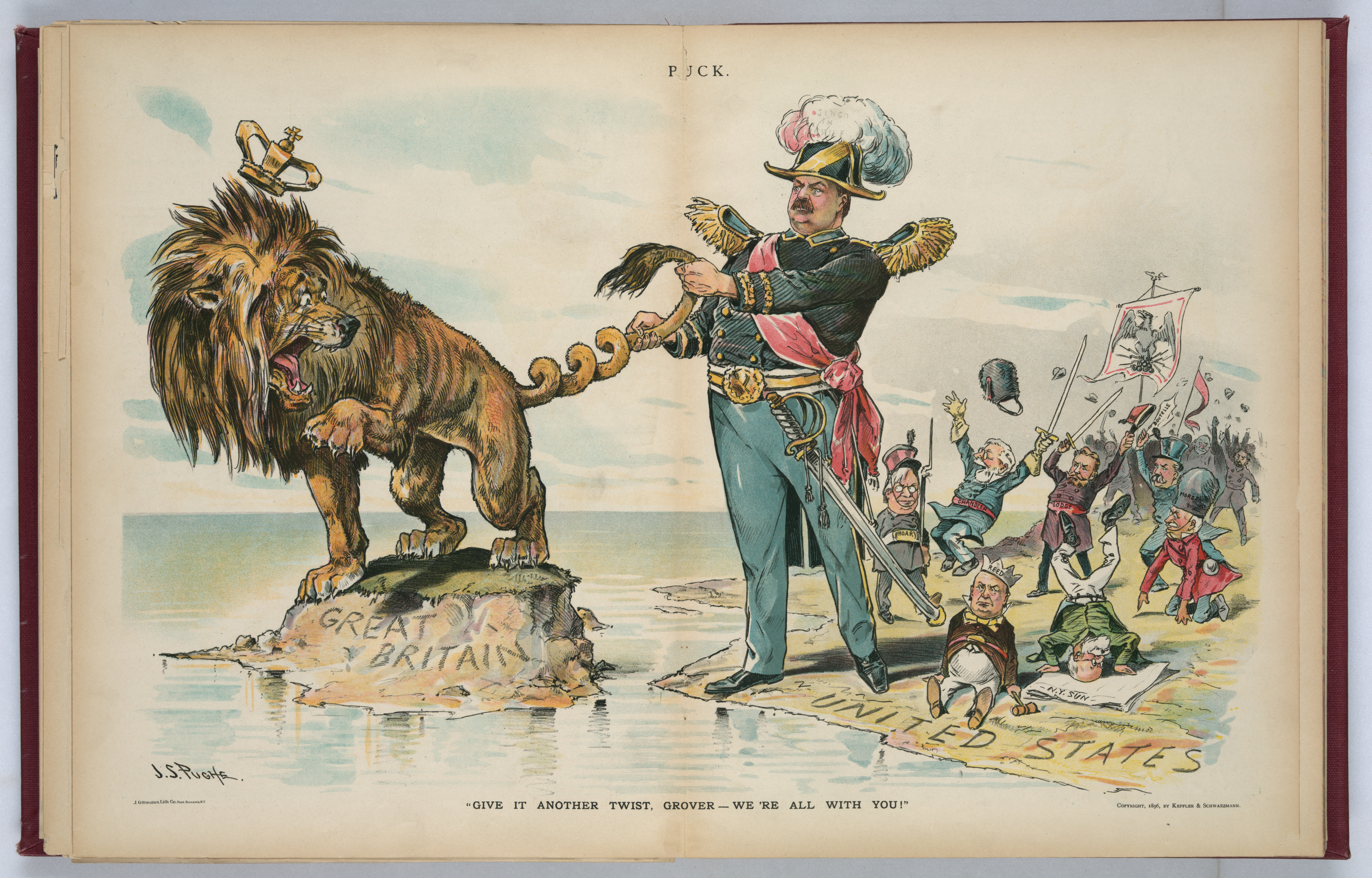
President Cleveland twists the tail of the British Lion regarding Venezuela—a policy hailed by Irish Catholics in the United States; cartoon in Puck by J.S. Pughe, 1895

The tension with Germany had subsided in 1890 after a deal exchanged German holdings in East Africa for an island off the German coast. However, with peace-minded Bismarck retired by an aggressive new Kaiser, tensions rose and negotiations faltered. France retreated in Africa after the British dominated in the Fashoda Incident. The Venezuela crisis was settled amicably and London and Washington became friendly after Salisbury gave Washington what it wanted in the Alaska boundary dispute. The Open Door Policy and a 1902 treaty with Japan resolved the China crisis. However, in South Africa a nasty Boer war broke out in 1899 and for a few months it seemed the Boers were winning.

==== Venezuela crisis with the United States ====
In 1895 the Venezuelan crisis with the United States erupted. A border dispute between the colony of British Guiana and Venezuela caused a major Anglo-American crisis when the United States intervened to take Venezuela's side. Propaganda sponsored by Venezuela convinced American public opinion that the British were infringing on Venezuelan territory. The United States demanded an explanation and Salisbury refused. The crisis escalated when President Cleveland, citing the Monroe Doctrine, issued an ultimatum in late 1895. Salisbury's cabinet convinced him he had to go to arbitration. Both sides calmed down and the issue was quickly resolved through arbitration which largely upheld the British position on the legal boundary line. Salisbury remained angry but a consensus was reached in London, led by Lord Landsdowne, to seek much friendlier relations with the United States. By standing with a Latin American nation against the encroachment of the British, the US improved relations with the Latin Americans, and the cordial manner of the procedure improved American diplomatic relations with Britain. Despite the popularity of the Boers in American public opinion, official Washington supported London in the Second Boer War.

==== Africa ====
An Anglo-German agreement (1890) resolved conflicting claims in East Africa; Great Britain received large territories in Zanzibar and Uganda in exchange for the small island of Helgoland in the North Sea. Negotiations with Germany on broader issues failed. In January 1896 German Kaiser Wilhelm II escalated tensions in South Africa with his Kruger telegram congratulating Boer President Paul Kruger of the Transvaal for beating off the British Jameson Raid. German officials in Berlin had managed to stop the Kaiser from proposing a German protectorate over the Transvaal. The telegram backfired, as the British began to see Germany as a major threat. The British moved their forces from Egypt south into Sudan in 1898, securing complete control of that troublesome region. However, a strong British force unexpectedly confronted a small French military expedition at Fashoda. Salisbury quickly resolved the tensions, and systematically moved toward friendlier relations with France.

==== Second Boer War ====
After gold was discovered in the South African Republic (called Transvaal) in the 1880s, thousands of British men flocked to the gold mines. Transvaal and its sister republic the Orange Free State were small, rural, independent nations founded by Afrikaners, who descended from Dutch immigrants to the area before 1800. The newly arrived miners were needed for their labour and business operations but were distrusted by the Afrikaners, who called them "uitlanders". The uitlanders heavily outnumbered the Boers in cities and mining districts; they had to pay heavy taxes, and had limited civil rights and no right to vote. The British, jealous of the gold and diamond mines and highly protective of its people, demanded reforms, which were rejected. A small-scale private British effort to overthrow Transvaal's President Paul Kruger, the Jameson Raid of 1895, was a fiasco and presaged full-scale conflict as all diplomatic efforts failed.

War started on 11 October 1899 and ended on 31 May 1902 as Great Britain faced the two small far-away Boer nations. The Prime Minister let his extremely energetic colonial minister Joseph Chamberlain take charge of the war. British efforts were based from its Cape Colony and the Colony of Natal. There were some native African allies, but generally, both sides avoided using black soldiers. The British war effort was further supported by volunteers from across the Empire. All other nations were neutral, but public opinion in them was largely hostile to Britain. Inside Britain and its Empire there also was a significant opposition to the Second Boer War because of the atrocities and military failures.

The British were overconfident and underprepared. Chamberlain and other top London officials ignored the repeated warnings of military advisors that the Boers were well prepared, well armed, and fighting for their homes in a very difficult terrain. The Boers with about 33,000 soldiers, against 13,000 front-line British troops, struck first, besieging Ladysmith, Kimberly, and Mafeking, and winning important battles at Colenso, Magersfontein and Stormberg in late 1899. Staggered, the British fought back, relieved its besieged cities, and prepared to invade first the Orange Free State, and then Transvaal in late 1900. The Boers refused to surrender or negotiate and reverted to guerrilla warfare. After two years of hard fighting, Britain, using over 400,000 soldiers systematically destroyed the resistance, raising worldwide complaints about brutality. The Boers were fighting for their homes and families, who provided them with food and hiding places. The British solution was to forcefully relocate all the Boer civilians into heavily guarded concentration camps, where 28,000 died of disease. Then it systematically blocked off and tracked down the highly mobile Boer combat units. The battles were small operations; most of the 22,000 British dead were victims of disease. The war cost £217 million and demonstrated the Army urgently needed reforms but it ended in victory for the British and the Conservatives won the Khaki election of 1900. The Boers were given generous terms, and both former republics were incorporated into the Union of South Africa in 1910.

The war had many vehement critics, predominantly in the Liberal Party. However, on the whole, the war was well received by the British public, which staged numerous public demonstrations and parades of support. Soon there were memorials built across Britain. Strong public demand for news coverage meant that the war was well covered by journalists – including young Winston Churchill – and photographers, as well as letter-writers and poets. General Sir Redvers Buller imposed strict censorship and had no friends in the media, who wrote him up as a blundering buffoon. In dramatic contrast, Field Marshal Frederick Roberts pampered the press, which responded by making him a national hero.

==== German naval issues ====
In 1897 Admiral Alfred von Tirpitz became German Naval Secretary of State and began the transformation of the Imperial German Navy from a small, coastal defence force to a fleet meant to challenge British naval power. Tirpitz called for a Risikoflotte or "risk fleet" that would make it too risky for Britain to take on Germany as part of a wider bid to alter the international balance of power decisively in Germany's favour. At the same time German foreign minister Bernhard von Bülow called for Weltpolitik (world politics). It was the new policy of Germany to assert its claim to be a global power. Chancellor Otto von Bismarck's policy of Realpolitik (realistic politics) was abandoned as Germany was intent on challenging and upsetting international order. The long-run result was the inability of Britain and Germany to be friends or to form an alliance.

Britain reacted to Germany's accelerated naval arms race with major innovations, especially those developed by Admiral Fisher. The most important development was unveiled – after Salisbury's death – the entry of HMS Dreadnought into service in 1906, which rendered all the world's battleships obsolete and set back German plans.

Historians agree that Salisbury was a strong and effective leader in foreign affairs. He had a superb grasp of the issues, and was never a "splendid isolationist" but rather, says Nancy W. Ellenberger, was:

A patient, pragmatic practitioner, with a keen understanding of Britain's historic interests ... He oversaw the partition of Africa, the emergence of Germany and the United States as imperial powers, and the transfer of British attention from the Dardanelles to Suez without provoking a serious confrontation of the great powers.

=== Domestic policy ===
At home he sought to "kill Home Rule with kindness" by launching a land reform programme which helped hundreds of thousands of Irish peasants gain land ownership and largely ended complaints against English landlords. The Elementary School Teachers (Superannuation) Act 1898 (61 & 62 Vict. c. 57) enabled teachers to secure an annuity via the payment of voluntary contributions. The Elementary Education (Defective and Epileptic Children) Act 1899 (62 & 63 Vict. c. 32) permitted school boards to provide for the education of mentally and physically defective and epileptic children.

=== Honours and retirement ===
In 1895 and 1900 he was honoured with appointments as Lord Warden of the Cinque Ports and High Steward of the City and Liberty of Westminster, which he held for life.

On 11 July 1902, in failing health and broken-hearted over the death of his wife, Salisbury resigned. He was succeeded by his nephew, Arthur Balfour. King Edward VII conferred upon him the Grand Cross of the Royal Victorian Order (GCVO), with the order star set in brilliants, during his resignation audience.

== Last year: 1902–1903 ==
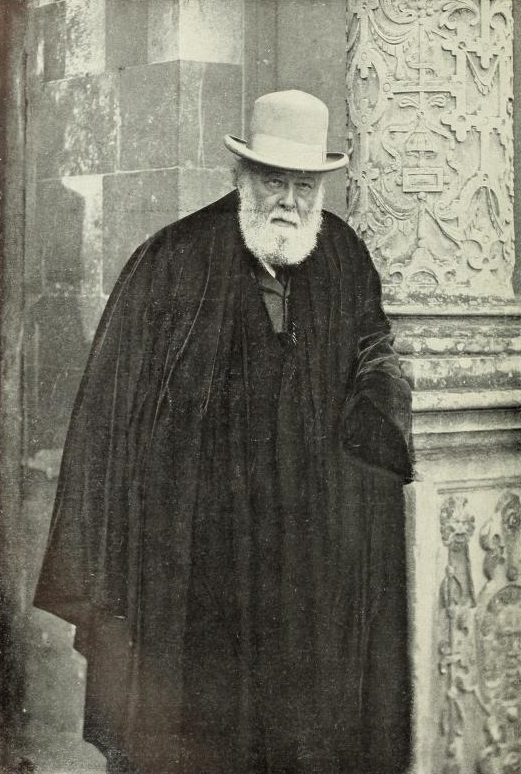
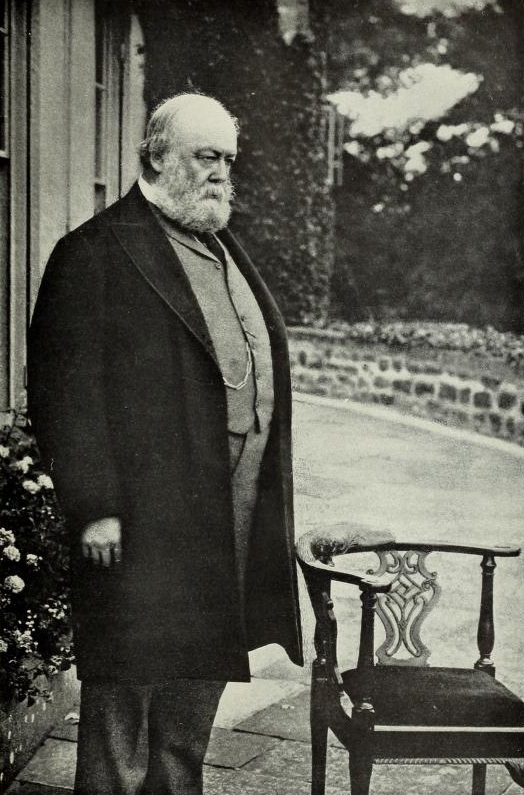
Salisbury in 1902, a year before his death.

Due to breathing difficulties caused by his great weight, Salisbury took to sleeping in a chair at Hatfield House. He also experienced a heart condition and later blood poisoning caused by an ulcerated leg. His death in August 1903 followed a fall from that chair.

Salisbury was buried at St Etheldreda's Church, Hatfield, where his predecessor as prime minister, Lord Melbourne, is also interred. Salisbury is commemorated with a monumental cenotaph near the west door of Westminster Abbey.

When Salisbury died his estate was valued at £310,336, (equivalent to £32,624,765 in 2025).

== Legacy ==
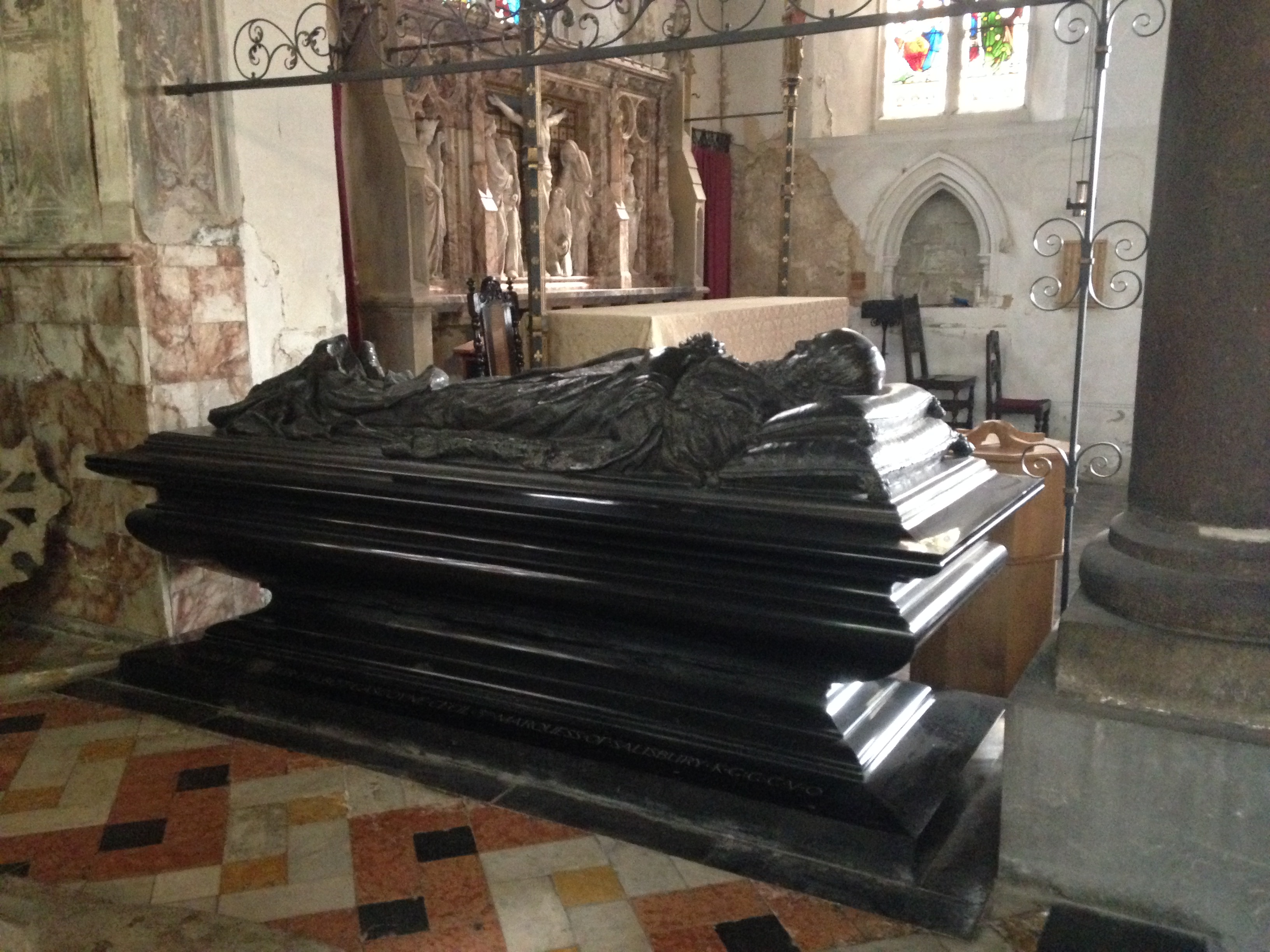
Monument commemorating Salisbury's burial at St Etheldreda Church, Hatfield, Hertfordshire

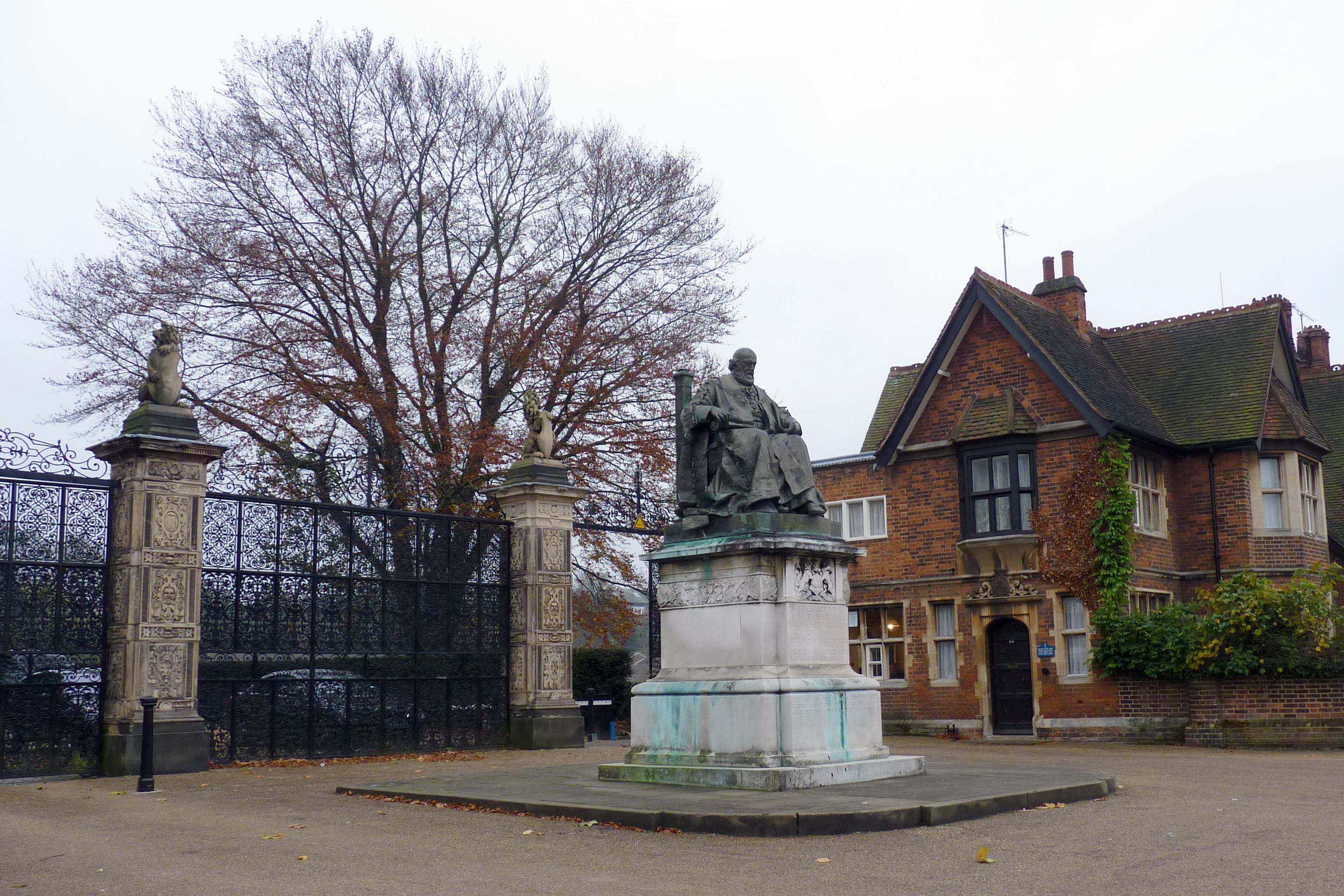
Statue of Salisbury in front of the park gates of Hatfield House

Many historians portray Salisbury as a principled statesman of traditional, aristocratic conservatism: a prime minister who promoted cautious imperialism and resisted sweeping parliamentary and franchise reforms. Robert Blake considers Salisbury "a great foreign minister, [but] essentially negative, indeed reactionary in home affairs". Professor P.T. Marsh's estimate is more favourable than Blake's; he portrays Salisbury as a leader who "held back the popular tide for twenty years." Professor Paul Smith argues that, "into the 'progressive' strain of modern Conservatism he simply will not fit." H.C.G. Matthew points to "the narrow cynicism of Salisbury". One admirer, conservative historian Maurice Cowling, largely agrees with the critics and says Salisbury found the democracy born of the 1867 and 1884 Reform Acts as "perhaps less objectionable than he had expected—succeeding, through his public persona, in mitigating some part of its nastiness." Historian Peter T. Marsh states: "In the field of foreign affairs, where he was happiest and most successful, he kept his own counsel and eschewed broad principles of conduct, preferring close-eyed realism and reliability of conduct."

Considerable attention has been devoted to his writings and ideas. The Conservative historian Robert Blake considered Salisbury "the most formidable intellectual figure that the Conservative party has ever produced". In 1977 the Salisbury Group was founded, chaired by Robert Gascoyne-Cecil, 6th Marquess of Salisbury and named after the 3rd Marquess. It published pamphlets advocating conservative policies. The academic quarterly The Salisbury Review was named in his honour (by Michael Oakeshott) upon its founding in 1982. Cowling claimed that "The giant of conservative doctrine is Salisbury". It was on Cowling's suggestion that Paul Smith edited a collection of Salisbury's articles from the Quarterly Review. Andrew Jones and Michael Bentley wrote in 1978 that "historical inattention" to Salisbury "involves wilful dismissal of a Conservative tradition which recognizes that threat to humanity when ruling authorities engage in democratic flattery and the threat to liberty in a competitive rush of legislation".

In 1967, Clement Attlee (Labour Party prime minister, 1945–1951) was asked who he thought was the best prime minister of his lifetime. Attlee immediately replied: "Salisbury".

The 6th Marquess of Salisbury commissioned Andrew Roberts to write Salisbury's authorised biography, which was published in 1999.

After the Bering Sea Arbitration, Canadian Prime Minister Sir John Sparrow David Thompson said of Lord Salisbury's acceptance of the Arbitration Treaty that it was "one of the worst acts of what I regard as a very stupid and worthless life".

The British phrase 'Bob's your uncle' is thought to have derived from Robert Cecil's appointment of his nephew, Arthur Balfour, as Chief Secretary for Ireland.

Fort Salisbury (now Harare) was named in honour of him when it was founded in September 1890. Subsequently, simply known as Salisbury, the city became the capital of Southern Rhodesia, from 1890, the Federation of Rhodesia and Nyasaland from 1953 to 1963, Rhodesia from 1963 to 1979, Zimbabwe Rhodesia, in 1979, and finally Zimbabwe, from 1980. The name was changed to Harare by the Zimbabwean president Robert Mugabe in April 1982, on the second anniversary of Zimbabwe's independence. Cecil Square, near to Parliament, was also named after him and not, as is erroneously but popularly thought, after Cecil Rhodes. Other Rhodesian/Zimbabwean connections include the suburbs of Hatfield, Cranborne and New Sarum.

To date he is the only British prime minister to sport a full beard. At 6 feet 4 inches (193 cm) tall, he was also the tallest prime minister.

== Family and personal life ==
Lord Salisbury's father, James Gascoyne-Cecil, 2nd Marquess of Salisbury, a minor Conservative politician, wanted him to marry a rich heiress to protect the family's lands. In 1857, he defied his father and instead married Georgina Alderson, the daughter of Sir Edward Alderson, a moderately notable judge of lower social standing than the Cecils, outside the aristocracy or landed gentry. The marriage proved a happy one. Robert and Georgina had eight children, all but one of whom survived infancy. He was an indulgent father and made sure his children had a much better childhood than the one through which he suffered. Cut off from his family money, Robert supported his family through journalism and was later reconciled with his father.

- Lady Beatrix Maud Cecil (11 April 1858 – 27 April 1950); she married William Palmer, 2nd Earl of Selborne on 27 October 1883. They had four children.
- Lady Gwendolen Cecil (28 July 1860 – 28 September 1945), author, and biographer of her father; she never married. SS Gwendolen, launched in 1899 on Lake Nyasa, was named after her.
- James Edward Hubert Gascoyne-Cecil, 4th Marquess of Salisbury (23 October 1861 – 4 April 1947); he married Lady Cicely Gore on 17 May 1887. They had seven children.
- Lord Rupert Ernest William Cecil, Lord Bishop of Exeter (9 March 1863 – 23 June 1936); he married Lady Florence Bootle-Wilbraham on 16 August 1887.
- Lord Edgar Algernon Robert Cecil, 1st Viscount Cecil of Chelwood (14 September 1864 – 24 November 1958); he married Lady Eleanor Lambton on 22 January 1889.
- Hon. Fanny Georgina Mildred Cecil (1 February 1866 – 24 April 1867)
- Lord Edward Herbert Cecil (12 July 1867 – 13 December 1918); he married Violet Maxse on 18 June 1894. They had two children.
- Lord Hugh Richard Heathcote Cecil, 1st Baron Quickswood (14 October 1869 – 10 December 1956)

Salisbury had prosopagnosia, a cognitive disorder which makes it difficult to recognise familiar faces.

== Cabinets of Lord Salisbury ==
=== 1885–1886 ===
Portfolio	Minister	Took office	Left office
Secretary of State for Foreign Affairs; Leader of the House of Lords	Robert Gascoyne-Cecil, 3rd Marquess of Salisbury (head of ministry)	23 June 1885	6 February 1886
First Lord of the Treasury	Stafford Northcote, 1st Earl of Iddesleigh	29 June 1885	1 February 1886
Lord Chancellor	Hardinge Giffard, 1st Baron Halsbury	24 June 1885	28 January 1886
Lord President of the Council	Gathorne Gathorne-Hardy, 1st Viscount Cranbrook	24 June 1885	6 February 1886
Lord Privy Seal	Dudley Ryder, 3rd Earl of Harrowby	24 June 1885	28 January 1886
Secretary of State for the Home Department	Sir Richard Cross	24 June 1885	1 February 1886
Secretary of State for the Colonies	Frederick Stanley	24 June 1885	28 January 1886
Secretary of State for War	William Henry Smith	24 June 1885	21 January 1886
Secretary of State for War	Gathorne Gathorne-Hardy, 1st Viscount Cranbrook	21 January 1886	6 February 1886
Secretary of State for India	Lord Randolph Churchill	24 June 1885	28 January 1886
First Lord of the Admiralty	Lord George Hamilton	1885	1886
Chancellor of the Exchequer; Leader of the House of Commons	Sir Michael Hicks Beach, 9th Baronet	24 June 1885	28 January 1886
President of the Board of Trade	Charles Gordon-Lennox, 6th Duke of Richmond	24 June 1885	19 August 1885
President of the Board of Trade	Edward Stanhope	19 August 1885	28 January 1886
Chief Secretary for Ireland	William Henry Smith	23 January 1886	28 January 1886
Postmaster General	Lord John Manners	1885	1886
Lord Lieutenant of Ireland	Henry Herbert, 4th Earl of Carnarvon	27 June 1885	28 January 1886
Lord Chancellor of Ireland	Edward Gibson, 1st Baron Ashbourne	1885	February 1886
Secretary for Scotland	Charles Gordon-Lennox, 6th Duke of Richmond	17 August 1885	28 January 1886
Vice-President of the Council	Edward Stanhope	24 June 1885	17 September 1885

== See also ==
- Victorian era
- Historiography of the British Empire
- International relations of the Great Powers (1814–1919)
- Splendid isolation
- Timeline of British diplomatic history

== Notes ==
Parliament of the United Kingdom
Preceded by John Herries; Frederic Thesiger	Member of Parliament for Stamford; 1853–1868; With: Frederic Thesiger 1853–1858; John Inglis 1858; Sir Stafford Northcote 1858–1866; Sir John Dalrymple Hay, Bt 1866–1868	Succeeded by Sir John Dalrymple Hay, Bt; Viscount Ingestre
Political offices
Preceded by The Earl of Ripon	Secretary of State for India; 1866–1867	Succeeded by Sir Stafford Northcote, Bt
Preceded by The Duke of Argyll	Secretary of State for India; 1874–1878	Succeeded by The Viscount Cranbrook
Preceded by The Earl of Derby	Foreign Secretary; 1878–1880	Succeeded by The Earl Granville
Preceded by The Earl of Beaconsfield	Leader of the Opposition; 1881–1885	Succeeded by William Ewart Gladstone
Preceded by William Ewart Gladstone	Prime Minister of the United Kingdom; 23 June 1885 – 28 January 1886	Succeeded by William Ewart Gladstone
Preceded by The Earl Granville	Foreign Secretary; 1885–1886	Succeeded by The Earl of Rosebery
Preceded by The Earl Granville	Leader of the House of Lords; 1885–1886	Succeeded by The Earl Granville
Preceded by William Ewart Gladstone	Leader of the Opposition; 1886	Succeeded by William Ewart Gladstone
Preceded by William Ewart Gladstone	Prime Minister of the United Kingdom; 25 July 1886 – 11 August 1892	Succeeded by William Ewart Gladstone
Preceded by William Ewart Gladstone	First Lord of the Treasury; 1886–1887	Succeeded by W.H. Smith
Preceded by The Earl Granville	Leader of the House of Lords; 1886–1892	Succeeded by The Earl of Kimberley
Preceded by The Earl of Iddesleigh	Foreign Secretary; 1887–1892	Succeeded by The Earl of Rosebery
Preceded by William Ewart Gladstone	Leader of the Opposition; 1892–1895	Succeeded by The Earl of Rosebery
Preceded by The Earl of Kimberley	Foreign Secretary; 1895–1900	Succeeded by The Marquess of Lansdowne
Preceded by The Earl of Rosebery	Prime Minister of the United Kingdom; 25 June 1895 – 11 July 1902	Succeeded by Arthur Balfour
Preceded by The Earl of Rosebery	Leader of the House of Lords; 1895–1902	Succeeded by The Duke of Devonshire
Preceded by The Viscount Cross	Lord Privy Seal; 1900–1902	Succeeded by Arthur Balfour
Party political offices
Preceded by The Earl of Beaconsfield	Leader of the Conservative Party in the House of Lords; 1881–1902	Succeeded by The Duke of Devonshire
Preceded by The Earl of Beaconsfield	Leader of the Conservative Party; 1881–1902; Served alongside: Sir Stafford Northcote, Bt 1881–1885	Succeeded by Arthur Balfour
Academic offices
Preceded by The Earl of Derby	Chancellor of the University of Oxford; 1869–1903	Succeeded by The Viscount Goschen
Honorary titles
Preceded by The Marquess of Dufferin and Ava	Lord Warden of the Cinque Ports; 1895–1903	Succeeded by The Lord Curzon of Kedleston
Peerage of Great Britain
Preceded by James Gascoyne-Cecil	Marquess of Salisbury; 1868–1903	Succeeded by James Gascoyne-Cecil
