= St Etheldreda's Church, Hatfield =

Church in Hertfordshire, England

St Etheldreda's Church
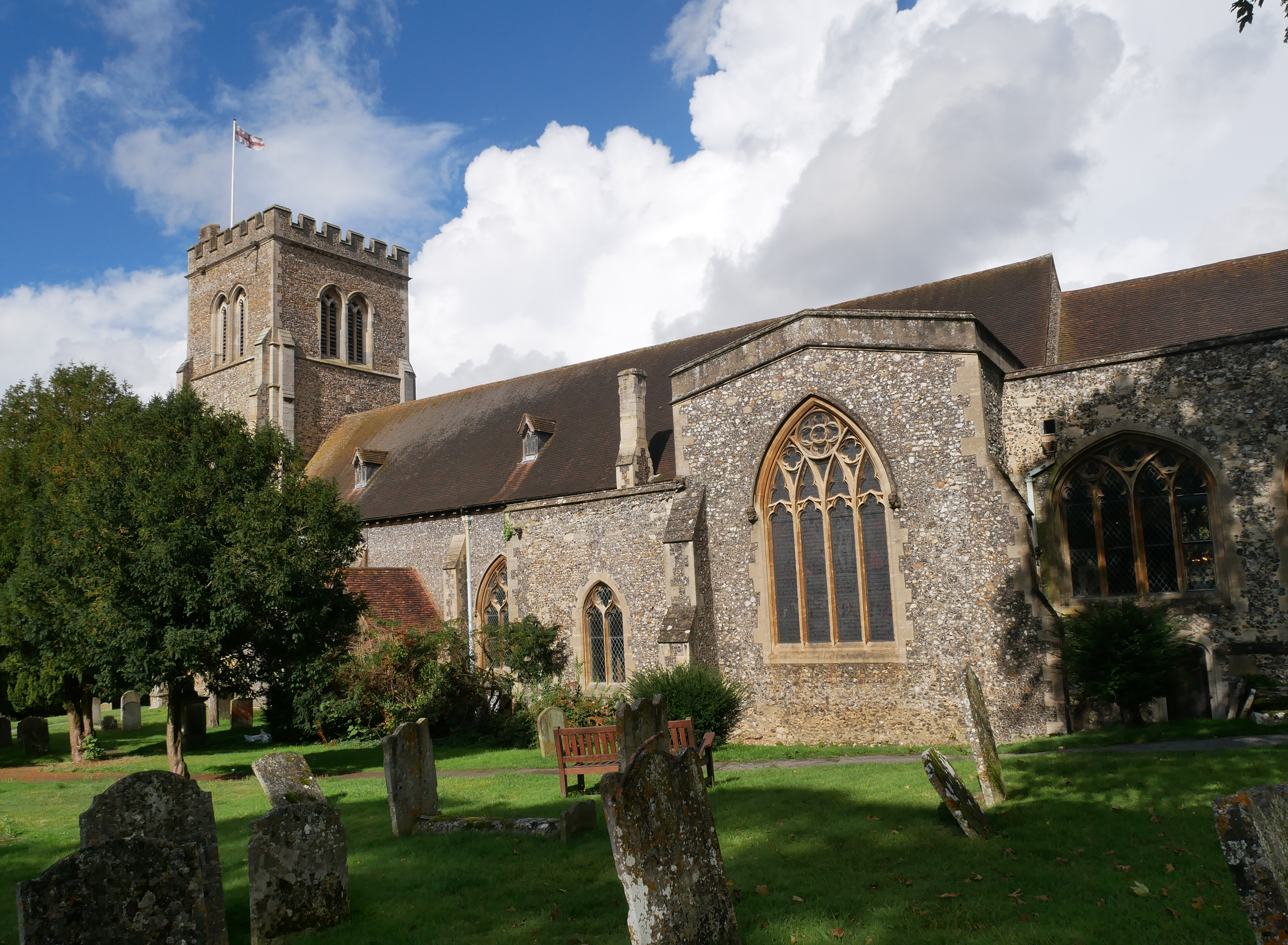
- The church from the churchyard. View, from the south east showing the south transept, nave, and tower.
- St Etheldreda's Church
- 51°45′41″N 0°12′45″W
- Denomination: Church of England
- Website: www.stetheldreda.org

History
- Dedication: St Etheldreda

Administration
- Province: Canterbury
- Diocese: St Albans
- Parish: Parish of Bishop’s Hatfield St Etheldreda with St Luke

Clergy
- Vicar(s): Bishops Hatfield Team Ministry, Fr. Darren Collins, Rector.

St Etheldreda's is the Anglican parish church of Old Hatfield, Hertfordshire in the United Kingdom. Parts of the building are 13th century and there is evidence there was a church here before this in Saxon times. It is situated in the old village of Hatfield just east of the modern town of Hatfield and close to the walls of Hatfield House, once a royal palace. It once served Hatfield House, as well as the village, as a place of worship and is exceptionally grand for a parish church. The dedication to St Etheldreda derives from the Bishops of Ely for whom she is a patron saint. She once occupied the House when it was a bishops' palace.

== Description ==
The church stands at the top of a hill with Old Hatfield village centre to the west. The building material is largely flint. It is cruciform with a tower at the western end. Most construction was between the 13th and 15th centuries.

Two chapels have been added on either side of the chancel; on the north side is the Salisbury Chapel and on the south side the Brocket Chapel. The Salisbury Chapel is the traditional burial place of the Cecil family and contains the ornate tomb of Robert Cecil, the first Earl of Salisbury. Two British Prime Ministers, Lord Melbourne and Lord Salisbury (both the first and last Prime Ministers of Queen Victoria's reign), are also interred here. Some rebuilding, particularly of the window tracery, was done during the Victorian era.

Historically, St Etheldreda's Church had a steeple on top of the west tower and this is shown in many early illustrations. It was last re-erected in 1847 to commemorate the visit to the town of Queen Victoria and Prince Albert. However it was removed in 1930.

There are eight bells in the tower which now form a Carillon, installed in 1786. It is set to play different tunes on each day of the week.

There are many memorials, the oldest being a knight in armour of about 1160.
