= Amy Louisa Rye =

- Born: Amy Louisa Haslam; 1851; Brompton, Middlesex, England
- Died: 24 August 1918 (aged 66–67); Ewhurst, Surrey, England
- Occupations: writer; social reformer
- Spouses: Francis Rye (m. 1875; died 1884); Thomas Okey
- Children: 2
- Relatives: Edward Caldwell Rye; Maria Rye; Walter Rye
- Writing career
- Pen name: Mrs. Francis Rye

Amy Louisa Rye (née , Haslam; after first marriage, Rye; after second marriage, Okey; pen name, Mrs. Francis Rye; 1851 – 24 August 1918) was a British writer and social reformer who emigrated to Canada. She published three books and several articles. In London in the 1890s, she served as Hon. Secretary of the State Children's Aid Association.

== Early life ==
Amy Louisa Haslam was born in Brompton, Middlesex, England in 1851. Her parents were Joseph Haslam (b. 1809) and Susannah Pope (Cobden) Haslam (b. 1817). Rye's siblings were Frederick (b. 1838), Charlotte (b. 1842), Henry (b. 1844), William (b. 1844), Alice (b. 1845), Florence (b. 1849), and Bertha (b. 1853).

== Career ==
=== Social reformer ===
After the establishment of the State Children's Aid Association in 1896, Rye served as its Honorary Secretary, with Arthur Peel, 1st Viscount Peel as chair and Alfred Fowell Buxton as the Hon. Treasurer. At the annual Conference of the National Council of Women of Great Britain, held at Croydon, in October, 1897, Rye read a paper on "The Early Care and Training of Children under the Poor-law". The Economic Review (1898) criticized it, saying that Rye naturally laboured under a strong bias arising probably alike from her convictions and her position. Her conclusions (quoted from Sir Godfrey Lushington), that the transference of pauper schools from the Home Office to the Education Department was necessary in order "to restore the children to society, to improve the standard of teaching, and to prevent the children from feeling a class apart," could be considered untenable, as abundance of proof existed that these three objects were already fully attained under existing circumstances.

=== Author ===
Rye wrote and illustrated A White Child in 1883. A reviewer in The Athenaeum (1883) wrote, "a wild rhapsody which borrows most of its feeble fancies from well-known sources. The spinning-girl, the poet, the princesses of the hospital, and all the other creatures ... are like the figures of a mad dream, and the illustrations are worthy of them."

Published in 1895, she co-authored A Calendar of the Correspondence and Documents relating to the Family of Oliver le Neve, of Witchingham, Norfolk, from 1675 to 1743, by the late Mr. Francis Rye and his widow, Mrs. Amy Rye, with a preface, and memoirs of Peter le Neve, Sir William le Neve, and others, with indexes by Walter Rye. Walter Rye was Francis Rye's brother. Francis and Walter's other siblings included the social reformer, Maria Rye, and the entomologist, Edward Caldwell Rye.

Of The Beloved Son (1900), a reviewer in The Speaker (1901) mentions that the best element in the book lay in the names of the chapters.

== Personal life ==
Haslam first married Francis Rye (1848-1884) on n 15 July 1875, in Niagara, Ontario, Canada. He was a Canadian Shakespeare scholar of Barrie, and she made this city her home. They had two children, Hugh (b. 1878) and Francis (b. 1883).

Secondly, she married Thomas Okey (b. 1852).

Amy Louisa Okey died at Thornbrook, Ewhurst, Surrey, 24 August 1918.

== Selected works ==
=== Books ===
- A White Child, 1883 (text)
- A Calendar of the Correspondence and Documents relating to the Family of Oliver le Neve, of Witchingham, Norfolk, from 1675 to 1743, by the late Mr. Francis Rye and his widow, Mrs. Amy Rye, with a preface, and memoirs of Peter le Neve, Sir William le Neve, and others, with indexes by Walter Rye (with Francis Rye), 1895
- The Beloved Son. The Story of Jesus Christ Told to Children, 1900 (text)

=== Articles ===
- "Schools of Italian Art (conclusion), III The Venetian School.", The Political Destiny of Canada, 1877
- "A Modern Proserpine: A London Story", The Canadian Monthly and National Review, 1878
- "Charlotte's System", Rose-Belford's Canadian Monthly and National Review, 1880
- "Recent Notes by Mr. Ruskin", Rose-Belford's Canadian Monthly and National Review, 1880
- "The Mohammedan Princess", Rose-Belford's Canadian Monthly and National Review, 1880
