= Crowdy =

Crowdy may refer to:

== People ==
- Edith Frances Crowdy CBE (1880–1947) was the deputy director of the Women's Royal Naval Service.
- Joseph Crowdy CB (1923–2009) was an English soldier and military doctor.
- Rachel Crowdy DBE (1884–1964) was an English nurse and social reformer.
- William Saunders Crowdy (1847–1908) was an American soldier, preacher and entrepreneur.

== Places ==
- Crowdy Bay National Park is a national park in New South Wales, Australia.
- Crowdy Reservoir is a reservoir in Cornwall, United Kingdom.
