= Women's Emigration Society =

- Formation: 1880
- Dissolved: 1884
- Key people: Louisa Hubbard; Lady Strangford

The Women's Emigration Society was a 19th-century English organization devoted to helping poor young women emigrate from England to the colonies of the British Empire. It was superseded by other organisations and alliances.

== History ==
Societies concerned with women emigrants to the British colonies had existed since at least 1849. This society was established by Louisa Hubbard and Caroline Blanchard in 1880 and was active until superseded in 1884. Another person credited with founding the organisation was Emily Anne Smythe.

The goal of the society was to allow women with few opportunities in England to move to places such as North America or New Zealand. The organizers of the society believed that women would be able to find employment much more easily in these locations than they were able to in England. They generally attempted to find women jobs as governesses or helpers for families. They also believed that women would be able to find husbands through these professions.

Hubbard began believing in the importance of female emigration from England in 1877. A writer pointed out to her that many more men than women had emigrated from England and that there were many opportunities for women in the British colonies. She then began publishing articles about this in her magazine, The Women's Gazette. These articles caught the attention of other emigration advocates and they soon met with Hubbard and decided to form the society. The society often worked with branches of the YWCA in the locations that they sought to place women.

Hubbard later realized that there were several different societies working interdependently to promote emigration and decided to try to unify them. She then published a book titled The United Englishwomen's Emigration Register and founded the United Englishwomen's Emigration Association to try to unify the women's emigration movement. In 1884 Caroline Blanchard also began the Colonial Emigration Society to focus on promoting emigration.

== Later ==
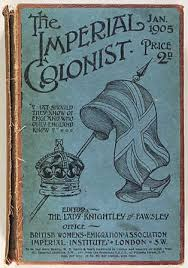
The Imperial Colonist for January 1905

Ellen Joyce founded the United British Women's Emigration Association in 1888. She became Vice-President of the society and she became a CBE in 1920. A fellow awardee that year was Grace Lefroy who was the honorary secretary of the WES.

Louisa Knightley was president of the South African Colonisation Society and she was the editor the society's Imperial Colonist journal from 1901 to 1913.
