= Mary Elizabeth Townsend =

British philanthropist

- Born: 23 July 1841; Kilkenny, Ireland
- Died: 14 June 1918 (aged 76)
- Known for: Co-founder of the Girls' Friendly Society
- Spouse: Frederick Townsend (m. 1863; died 1905)
- Children: 0
- Parents: Robert Butler (father); Grace Hamilton (mother)
- Relatives: William Rowan Hamilton (cousin)

Mary Elizabeth Townsend (23 July 1841 – 14 June 1918) was a British philanthropist and co-founder of the Girls' Friendly Society.

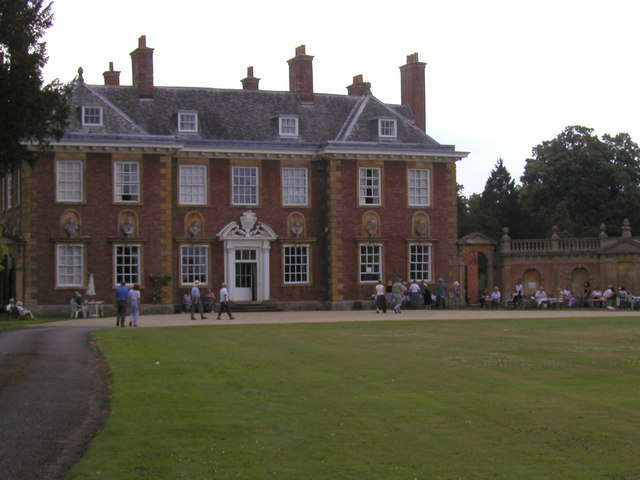
Honington Hall, her home for most of her life

== Early life ==
Mary Elizabeth Butler was born in Kilkenny, then part of the United Kingdom of Great Britain and Ireland, into a family embedded in the Church of Ireland (i.e. not the Catholic Church). Her father Robert Butler was vicar of St John's Church in that city and chaplain to the Earl of Ormond. Her mother was Grace Hamilton, daughter of another minister, James Hamilton of Trim, County Meath. James ran a school, and took in and educated his nephew, Grace's cousin, and Mary's first cousin once removed, William Rowan Hamilton. William was a mathematical prodigy, who eventually became Royal Astronomer of Ireland.

Mary's parents died when she was a young child and she was raised in England by her father's sisters.

== Early philanthropy ==
Aged 21, she married an artist and botanist almost twice her age, Frederick Townsend (1823–1905), also of a clergy family. It was a happy and productive partnership; she put herself in his hands and was glad, as she put it, "to grow and develop under his care". They lived at first at Shedfield Lodge near Wickham, Hampshire. (The building is now a care home.) Both husband and wife worked at improving life for the people of the estate. Mary Townsend concentrated her efforts on the education of girls, the orphanage for girls, and the care of the ill and the old.

One of their visitors was Rev. Thomas Vincent Fosbery, chaplain to Samuel Wilberforce. Bishop of Winchester. The Bishop, impressed by her work with the girls and young women, invited her to develop an organisation on a larger scale, to tackle what was called in Victorian times the problem of "fallen women". Domestic service was by far the largest employer of women, and those who got pregnant out of wedlock faced losing not only their job but also their housing. Townsend decided to focus on prevention, by providing practical and moral support to what, a generation later, the Society's official historian called "working girls of unblemished character".

== Girls' Friendly Society ==
Fosbery introduced her to other key women: Elizabeth Carlyon, wife of Harold Browne, Wilberforce's successor as Bishop of Winchester; Catharine Tait, founder of the Ladies Diocescan Society in 1865 and wife of Archibald Campbell Tait, Archbishop of Canterbury; and Jane Senior, who shortly afterwards went on to co-found the Metropolitan Association for Befriending Young Servants. They met in 1874 at Lambeth Palace, the official residence of the Archbishop of Canterbury, and founded the Girls' Friendly Society.

Its work began officially on 1 January 1875 and it soon became enormously successful. Townsend imagined from the outset that the Society would extend throughout the British Empire. In 1880 it received the royal patronage of Queen Victoria. By the turn of the century, it had established over 1300 branches and counted almost a quarter of a million members. The Society remained non-denominational, though it used the structures of the Church of England.

The official history, re-published in 1911, makes it clear that Townsend was the driving force behind the GFS, and that her genius was in seeing the need for structure. Men of all classes had their clubs and associations of mutual benefit; Townsend extended this to girls:

'When we see what wonders are accomplished in worldly matters, by the power of organisation, association, and cooperation, when we know how strong are the links that bind together the members of Freemasons' Clubs, of Benefit Societies, the members of different professions, and the like, surely we cannot but feel that this mighty lever should be used for the purpose of moral and spiritual benefit [...].' That was the idea which was then given to the world--not the idea of work for girls, but the idea of organised work. There were isolated efforts in many directions, but the idea of an organised association for the upholding of the purity of Christian maidenhood, based upon the foundation of the national Church, was a totally new thought, and this we owe to our Foundress, both in its first inception and in its ultimate completion.

Townsend was the first president of the GFS and served as such through 1882. She was succeeded by Lady Grey who served from 1883 through 1889, when Townsend again resumed the presidency from 1890 through 1892.

== Later life ==
Also in 1875, Townsend's husband inherited Honington Hall, a 17th-century country house near Shipston-on-Stour, Warwickshire, where they lived from that point on. From 1886 he served as the Conservative MP for Stratford-on-Avon, but did not stand again in 1892.

He died in 1905. She survived him by 13 years. They had no children.
