= Colonial Intelligence League for Educated Women =

British women's colonisation league (1910–1919)

- Successor: Society for the Oversea Settlement of British Women
- Formation: 23 February 1910
- Dissolved: 1919
- President: Princess Helena of the United Kingdom
- Secretary: Caroline Grosvenor
- Key people: Nina Boyle

The Colonial Intelligence League for Educated Women (CIL, 1910–1919) was a British organisation founded by Caroline Grosvenor. It aimed to address the perceived problem of educated "surplus women" by encouraging them to colonize Canada and other colonies of the British Empire as agricultural workers.

== History ==
The Colonial Intelligence League for Educated Women was founded by Caroline Grosvenor on 23 February 1910. It aimed to address the perceived problem of educated "surplus women" by encouraging them to colonize Canada and other colonies of the British Empire, and worked alongside the United British Women's Emigration Association and the South African Colonisation Society (SACS). Grosvenor had also been active with the SACS.

The three objectives of the League were set out in the first annual report of 1910:

1. maintain an "Intelligence Office" in England that estimated the demands for women’s work in the colonies.
2. establish in each of the colonies expert agents who would investigate local opportunities and conditions.
3. establish in each a "Colony of Settlements for Women" where they could be trained for local conditions.

Until 1914, the league concentrated on emigration to Canada. Grosvenor recommended that women hoping to emigrate attend the Colonial Training College at Stoke Prior and a farm settlement known as the "Princess Patricia Ranch" was established in the Okanagan Valley, British Columbia, as the training centre for newly arrived emigrant women. Princess Patricia Ranch could train 8 to 10 women at a time, with their labour being given in exchange for board, lodging and agricultural training. The League also supported women with little capital but who wished to set up in business in the colonies.

The League's executive committee included representatives of the Central Bureau of Employment for Women and reserved half of the seats for headmistresses so that they could promote the work of the League in their schools. Princess Helena of the United Kingdom, daughter of Queen Victoria, served as honorary president and Caroline Grosvenor served as a secretary.

On 2 March 1911 the organisation was re-established as the Colonial Intelligence League (CIL) and branches were established in the Scottish cities of Edinburgh and Glasgow. That year the Imperial Colonist also became the official journal of the League.

In December 1919, the CIL merged with the British Women's Emigration Association and the South African Colonisation Society to form the Society for the Overseas Settlement of British Women.

== See also ==
- Women's Emigration Society
