= Mary Townsend =

Mary Townsend may refer to:

- Mary Townsend (entomologist) (1814–1851), American abolitionist and entomologist
- Mary Townsend (artist) (1822–1869), New Zealand artist
- Mary Ashley Townsend (1836–1901), American poet
- Mary Elizabeth Townsend (1841–1918), British philanthropist and co-founder of the "Girls' Friendly Society"
- Mary Townsend Seymour (1876–1957), African-American politician
