= United British Women's Emigration Association =

British women's emigration organisation (1884–1919)

- Successor: Society for the Overseas Settlement of British Women
- Founded: 1884
- Dissolved: 1919
- President: Ellen Joyce
- Vice-Presidents: Mary Benson; Louisa Knightley
- Patron: Alexandra of Denmark
- Publication: Imperial Colonist
- Formerly called: United Englishwomen's Emigration Association

The United British Women's Emigration Association (UBWEA; formerly the United Englishwomen's Emigration Association, UEEA; 1884–1919) was a philanthropic organisation founded by Ellen Joyce to encourage women's emigration from the United Kingdom of Great Britain and Ireland to the colonies of the British Empire.

== History ==
Ellen Joyce founded the United Englishwomen's Emigration Association (UEEA) in 1884, after working as the "emigration correspondent" for Girls' Friendly Society (GFS) from 1883. It was a philanthropic organisation which aimed to encourage women's emigration from the United Kingdom of Great Britain and Ireland to the colonies of the British Empire, including Australia and New Zealand. It absorbed the Female Middle Class Emigration Society in 1884.

In 1888, the name was altered to the United British Women's Emigration Association as Scottish emigrants of the Scotch Girl's Friendly Association and the Scottish Young Women's Christian Association (YWCA) also wanted to travel under the organisation's banner.

Joyce served as President and Mary Benson, wife of Edward White Benson the Archbishop of Canterbury, and Louisa Knightley, Lady Knightley, served as Vice-Presidents. Supporters included Barbara Bodichon, Isa Craig, Louisa Goldsmid, Mary Jane Kinnaird, Helen Munro Ferguson, Viscountess Novar, and Bessie Rayner Parkes. Alexandra of Denmark, Queen of the United Kingdom, was patron from 1902.

Joyce identified who were the "right" type of women emigrants and had the right to make the final decision on the suitability of candidates as the UBWEA's "Organising Referee." She was also keen for white women to marry, as "the possibility of a settler marrying his own countrywoman is of Imperial as well as family importance."

Emigration loans were offered to female factory workers and homes for the approved women emigrants waiting to depart from Britain were created in Liverpool in 1887 and in London in 1893. Joyce Hostel for female immigrants was also opened at Kelowna in British Columbia, Canada, in 1913.

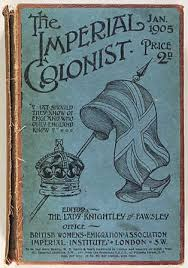
January 1905 edition of the Imperial Colonist

In 1901, United was dropped from the Association title. That year, the Imperial Colonist journal was founded as the "Official Organ" of both the BWEA and the South African Colonisation Society (SACS), a subcommittee of the BWEA formed in 1903. It was edited by Louisa Knightly from 1901 to 1913 and ran until March 1927, when it merged with the Oversea Settler.

In the first issue of the Imperial Colonist, Joyce wrote:

"The women wanted in Western Canada are those healthy, countrybred women who love and understand animal life, and who prefer the freedom of the country to the conventionalities of the town. They must be women of some culture, but who have training in domestic arts by practicing them, and who will keep up the tone of the men with whom they mix by music and book lore when the day’s work is done."

Joyce also interviewed Robert Baden-Powell for the Imperial Colonist in 1902 about the need for women in South Africa. Advertisements were also published in The Times to promote the Association.

In December 1919, the Association merged with SACS and the Colonial Intelligence League (CIL) to form the Society for the Overseas Settlement of British Women. Between 1884 and 1916 over 22,000 women emigrated to colonies of the British Empire under the guidance of the BWEA and SACS.

== See also ==
- Women's Emigration Society
