= Frederick Townsend (MP for Stratford-on-Avon) =

British politician (1822-1905)

Frederick Townsend FLS

Member of Parliament for Stratford-on-Avon
- In office 1 July 1886 – 4 July 1892
- Preceded by: Lord William Compton
- Succeeded by: Bertram Freeman-Mitford

Personal details
- Born: 5 December 1822 Rawmarsh, West Riding of Yorkshire, England
- Died: 16 December 1905 (aged 83) Cimiez, Nice, France
- Citizenship: British
- Party: Conservative
- Spouse: Mary Elizabeth Butler (m. 1863)
- Education: Harrow School; Trinity College, Cambridge

Frederick Townsend, FLS (5 December 1822 – 16 December 1905) was a British botanist and Conservative politician who served as a Member of Parliament for six years The standard author abbreviation F.Towns. is used to indicate this person as the author when citing a botanical name.

== Early life and education ==
Townsend was born in Rawmarsh, West Riding of Yorkshire to Rev. Edward James Townsend, a Church of England clergyman, whose parish was first Rawmarsh and then Ilmington near Stratford-on-Avon. Frederick was educated at Harrow and went on to study at Trinity College, Cambridge, where he gained a BA in 1850 and then an MA in 1855.

He was a respected amateur botanist and was elected a Fellow of the Botanical Society of Edinburgh in 1846 and as a Fellow of the Linnean Society in 1878. After living in Hampshire for several years he published the "Flora of Hampshire" in 1883, with 2nd edition in 1904. He was a friend to fellow botanists Cardale Babington and William Williamson Newbould. He was especially close to Newbould until his death in 1886.

== Parliamentary career ==
Townsend entered Parliament as MP for Stratford-on-Avon as a result of the 1886 general election in which the Conservative Marquess of Salisbury became Prime Minister, ousting the Liberal leader, William Gladstone. He defeated the incumbent Liberal MP, Lord William Compton, with a majority of 489 votes. The constituency has only once elected a non-Conservative candidate since then.

His first recorded contribution in the House of Commons was on the 7 May 1888 and was in regards to the Excise Duties (Local Purposes) Bill; he asked the then Chancellor of the Exchequer, George Goschen, whether a steam ploughing engine which was only used for agricultural purposes, and thus only travelled by road from the owner's home to their field or from field to field, would be exempt from the £5 duty on locomotives.

Townsend did not stand for re-election in the 1892 general election and so was succeeded by fellow Conservative Bertram Freeman-Mitford, grandfather of the Mitford sisters.

== Personal life ==
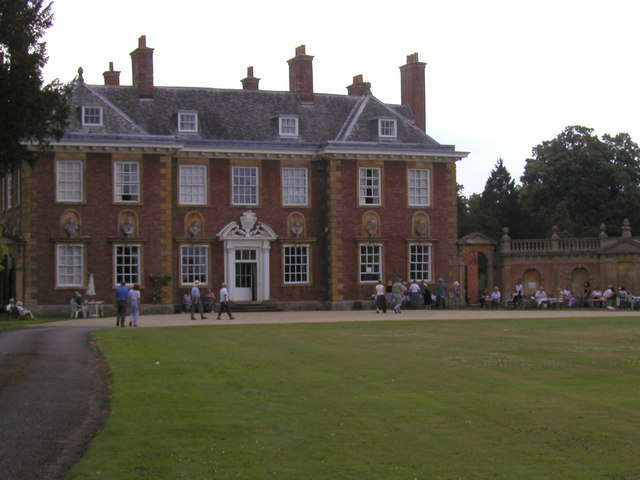
Honington Hall

In 1863 he married Mary Elizabeth Butler. They lived at first at Shedfield Lodge near Wickham, Hampshire. (The building is now a care home.) Both husband and wife worked at improving life for the people of the estate. Her work with the girls' school and orphanage drew the attention of leaders within the Church, and in the 1870s she was encouraged to set up a national organisation, the Girls' Friendly Society. He became a trustee, and supported her in what became her life-work.

As a result of the death of his uncle in 1874, Rev. H. Townsend, he inherited the family estate, Honington Hall, Warwickshire.

He died on the 16 December 1905 in Cimiez, Nice. His widow survived him by 13 years. They had no children.

Parliament of the United Kingdom
Preceded by Lord William Compton	Member of Parliament for Stratford-on-Avon; 1886–1892	Succeeded by Bertram Freeman-Mitford
