= William Williamson Newbould =

English botanist

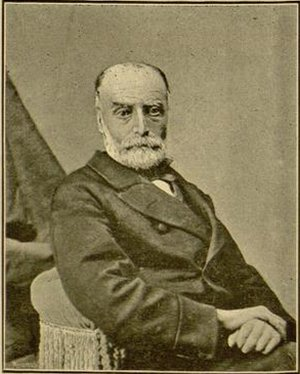
- Born: 20 January 1819; Sheffield
- Died: 16 April 1886 (aged 67); Kew
- Occupation: Botanist

William Williamson Newbould (20 January 1819 – 16 April 1886) was an English botanist.

== Biography ==
Newbould was born at Sheffield on 20 January 1819. He was the son of a merchant trading with Russia. From a preparatory school near Doncaster he proceeded to Trinity College, Cambridge, where he graduated B.A. in 1842, and M.A. in 1845. Ordained deacon in 1844 and priest in 1845, he became curate of Bluntisham, Huntingdonshire, and in 1848 of Comberton, Cambridgeshire, but subsequently refused at least one living from conscientious motives. About 1860 he took up his residence at Turnham Green, London, spending much of his time in the botanical department and reading-room of the British Museum. He afterwards lived for some years in Albany Street, Regent's Park, and, after taking temporary duty at Honington, Warwickshire, during a vacancy, he, in 1879, moved to Kew Green. Here, during the last seven years of his life, he constantly took part in the services at Kew and Petersham churches. He died at Kew, 16 April 1886, and was buried in Fulham cemetery. Newbould married a niece of the Rev. James Fendall, rector of Comberton, who survived him.

Newbould was a fellow of the Botanical Society of Edinburgh in 1841, an original member of the Ray Society in 1844, and a fellow of the Linnean Society in 1863. His interest in botany, begun at his first school and fostered by the lectures of John Bohler at Sheffield, was intensified by the lectures of Professor John Stevens Henslow, and the friendship of Mr. (later Professor) Cardale Babington, and Mr. Frederick Townsend at Cambridge. In 1842 he visited Jersey, in 1845 Scotland, in 1848 Wales, in 1852 the north, and in 1858 the south of Ireland, the last four excursions being made in company with Professor Babington; and in 1862 they joined M. Jacques Gay in North Wales. He also made several botanical excursions to the north of England. Though his knowledge of British botany was almost unrivalled, he can hardly be said to have published anything in his own name. The title-page of the fifth volume of the ‘Supplement to English Botany’ (1863) bears his name; but he always disclaimed all responsibility for it. He also signs, with Mr. John Gilbert Baker, the introduction to the second edition of his friend Hewett Cottrell Watson's ‘Topographical Botany’ (1883), upon which he bestowed much labour. His acute discrimination added five or six species to our knowledge of the British flora; but all his attainments were employed in helping other scientific workers rather than in making a reputation for himself. Professor Babington's ‘Flora of Cambridgeshire’ (1860), Mr. G. S. Gibson's ‘Flora of Essex’ (1862), Mr. Syme's ‘English Botany’ (1863–72), Messrs. Moore and More's ‘Cybele Hibernica’ (1866), Messrs. Henry Trimen and William Turner Thiselton-Dyer's ‘Flora of Middlesex’ (1869), Messrs. Davis and Lees's ‘West Yorkshire Flora’ (1878), Mr. Townsend's ‘Flora of Hampshire’ (1882), Mr. Alfred Reginald Pryor's ‘Flora of Hertfordshire’ (1887), and Mr. Bagnall's ‘Flora of Warwickshire’ (1891) were all materially assisted by his painstaking labours in examining herbaria, transcribing extracts from the early botanical writers, and revising proofs. His name is commemorated by a beautiful genus of Bignoniaceæ, Newbouldia, dedicated in 1863 by Dr. Berthold Carl Seemann to ‘one of the most painstaking of British botanists.’ His herbarium is largely incorporated in that of Dr. Trimen in the British Museum, and most of his manuscript notebooks are preserved in the botanical department. In addition to botany, Newbould was much interested in phrenology (the great phrenologist Johann Spurzheim having, as he was pleased to relate, nursed him, as a boy, on his knee) and in spiritualism. A total abstainer and almost a vegetarian, he exhibited practical sympathy with the wants of others, especially the poor.
