= South African Colonisation Society =

British women's colonising society (1903–1919)

- Predecessor: South African Expansion Committee
- Founded: 1903
- Dissolved: 1919
- Region served: South Africa
- President: Louisa Knightley
- Key people: Susan Harris, Countess of Malmesbury
- Parent organization: United British Women's Emigration Association

The South African Colonisation Society (SACS, 1903–1919) was an organisation founded to encourage women's colonising emigration from the United Kingdom of Great Britain and Ireland to South Africa after the Second Boer War. It acted as a subcommittee of the United British Women's Emigration Association (UBWEA).

== History ==
The South African Colonisation Society was founded in 1903 and succeeded the South African Expansion Committee. Louisa Knightley was president of the society. The society acted as a subcommittee of the United British Women's Emigration Association and encouraged women's colonising emigration from the United Kingdom of Great Britain and Ireland to South Africa after the Second Boer War (1899–1902).

Many of the women who were supported to emigrate by the Society became domestic servants in South Africa. The Society also supported teachers of music to be sent out from England to fill posts in South African government schools. By 1911, 30% of the women supported to emigrate to South Africa by the Society had married, mostly to white miners and artisans.

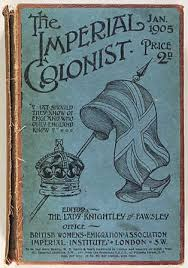
January 1905 edition of the Imperial Colonist

The Imperial Colonist journal was founded as the "Official Organ" of both the United British Women's Emigration Association (BWEA) and SACS. It was edited by Louisa Knightly from 1901 to 1913 and ran until March 1927, when it merged with the Oversea Settler. One emigrant, Mrs Chaplin, wrote to the journal in 1903 that: "it is intoxicating to read of all England is doing for Africa."

After World War I, the Society helped to co-ordinate female emigration as part of the Joint Council of Women's Emigration Societies.

In December 1919, the Society merged with the British Women's Emigration Association and the Colonial Intelligence League (CIL) to form the Society for the Overseas Settlement of British Women.

== See also ==
- Women's Emigration Society
