= Isabel Crowdy =

Social reformer and Women's Royal Naval Service member

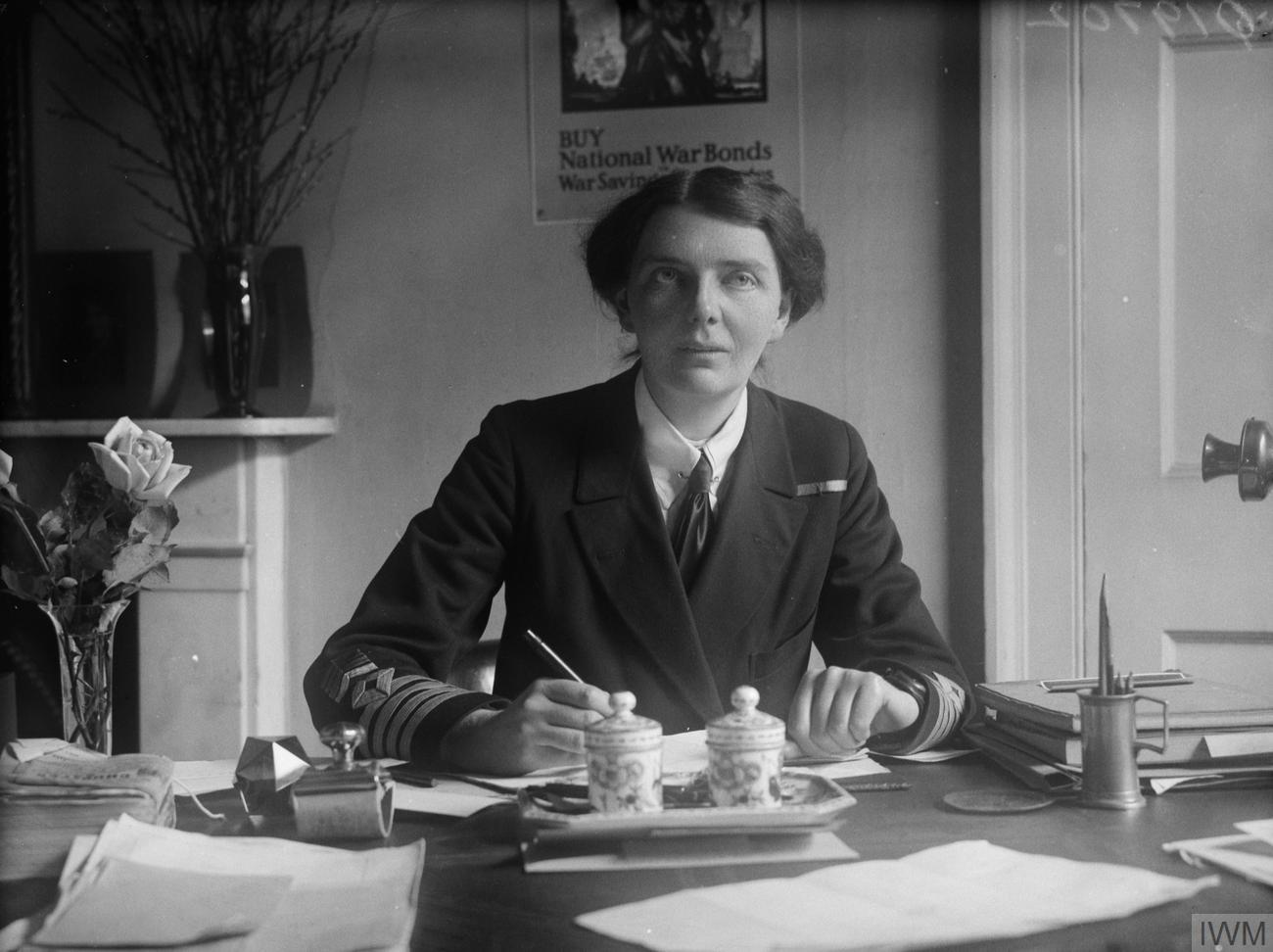
Isabel Crowdy in 1917

Isabel Crowdy OBE (1878 - 25 July 1941) was an English Women's Royal Naval Service member and social reformer. The inaugural secretary of the Society for the Overseas Settlement of British Women, she campaigned for the ongoing employment of women who had served in World War I and worked to make agricultural work and countryside holidays respected and accessible.

== Early life ==
She was the daughter of solicitor James Crowdy and his wife Mary, née Fuidge, one of five children including Edith Crowdy and Rachel Crowdy, both of whom also served in WWI and were interested in social reform. One of Isabel's areas of interest was the value of women's handicrafts in rural areas. She also served as Secretary of the Army and Navy Male Nurses’ Co-operative.

== World War I ==
During World War I, she supported the Voluntary Aid Detachment, where her sister Rachel was a member, along with her friend Katharine Furse. She was awarded the OBE on 23 June 1918 for her work as Commandant of Voluntary Aid Detachment Area for the British Red Cross Commission in France.

She then transferred to the Women's Royal Naval Service, where her sister Edith was deputy director, and was appointed assistant director of Inspection and Training on 9 March 1918.

She held an administrative role in the Association of Wrens, a society that held reunions for WRNS members, in 1921.

== Later career and activism ==
In 1920, Isabel was appointed General Secretary of the newly formed Society for the Overseas Settlement of British Women, where she became a member of the Council in 1922. Collaborating with the Women's Institute, she undertook publicity tours of rural areas, promoting agricultural work as beneficial and patriotic for women. The aim was to provide ongoing employment for women who had served during the war.

In the early 1930s she spent some time in Australia on the staff of Air Vice-Marshal Sir Philip Game, Governor of New South Wales, where she was estimated 'probably the most popular private secretary in Government House annals.' She was then appointed information officer to the Orient Line in 1934.

During World War II, she worked as secretary to the Children's Country Holiday Fund, organising country holidays for city children.

== Death ==
She died in London, 25 July 1941.
