= State Children's Aid Association =

State Children's Aid Association or State Children's Association was a British children's rights organization established in 1896 to support the welfare of pauper children. The association was active from 1897 until 1937. Its headquarters were in London, at 61 Old Broad Street, E.C. in 1899 and at 117 Picadilly, W.1. in 1923. The main objects of the association were to obtain individual treatment for children under the guardianship of the State, and to obtain for the State further powers of control over neglected children. It agitated for better treatment of the many thousand orphan and other children dependent upon the public and advocated for doing away with barrack schools.

The organization was established in 1896 by Henrietta Barnett and her sister's husband, Dr Ernest Hart. Its first chair was Hon. Lord Herschell. Serving on its governing committees in 1897, in addition to Barnett and Hart, were Sir William Hart Dyke, the Bishops of Hereford and Lichfield, Sir James Crichton-Browne , Sir Henry Thompson, and Dr. Thomas John Barnardo. In 1899, Arthur Peel, 1st Viscount Peel served as the chair, Alfred Fowell Buxton as Hon. Treasurer, and Mrs. Francis Rye as Hon. Secretary.

The State Children's Aid Association issued its first annual report in April 1898. Some of the association's committee records are held by the LSE Library Archives and Special Collections.
