= George Robert Waterhouse =

English naturalist (1810–1888)

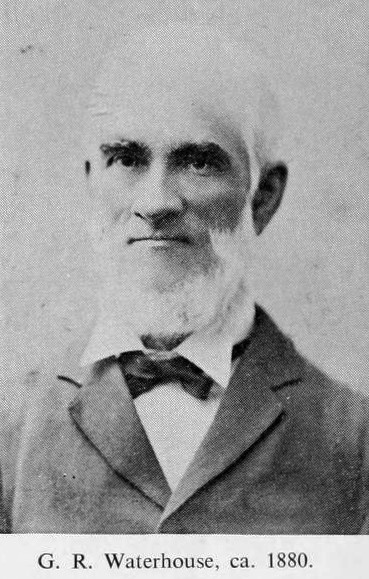
- Portrait c. 1880
- Born: 6 March 1810; Somers Town, London
- Died: 21 January 1888 (aged 77); Putney, Surrey
- Scientific career
- Fields: Natural history

George Robert Waterhouse (6 March 1810 – 21 January 1888) was an English naturalist. He was a keeper at the department of geology and later curator of the Zoological Society of London's museum.

== Early life ==
George was born in Somers Town to James Edward Waterhouse and Mary Newman. His father was a solicitor's clerk and an amateur entomologist. He was the brother of Frederick George Waterhouse, who also became a zoologist. George went to school at Koekelberg, near Brussels. He returned to England in 1824 and worked as an apprentice to an architect. Part of the work was in designing the garden of Charles Knight in the Vale of Health, Hampstead and the ornamentation for St. Dunstan's Church.

== Natural history ==
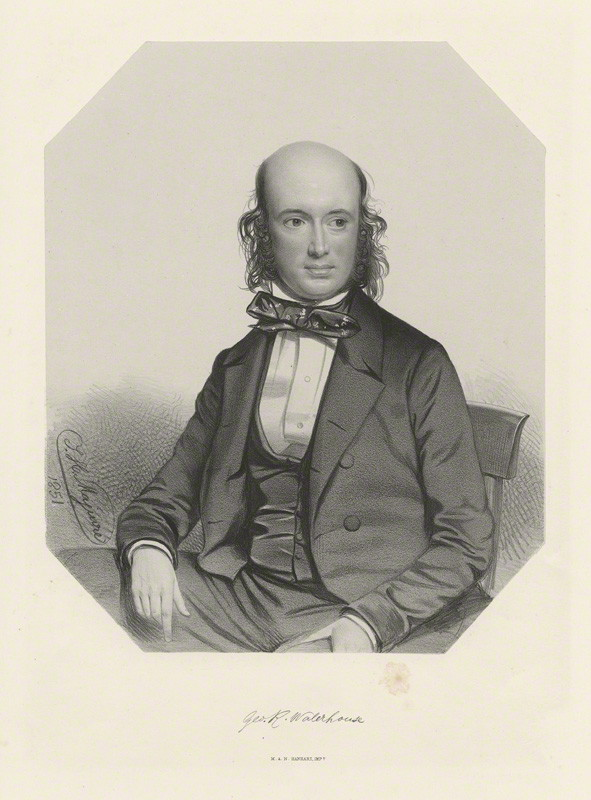
Portrait c. 1851 by Thomas Herbert Maguire

George became interested in entomology through his father and he founded the Entomological Society of London along with Frederick William Hope in 1833 with himself as honorary curator. He became its president in 1849–50. He wrote articles for Knight's Penny Cyclopædia. The Royal Institution at Liverpool appointed him curator of its museum in 1835 and he exchanged this in 1836 for a position at the Zoological Society of London. His early work was on cataloguing the mammals at the museum and although he completed the work the next year, it was not published as he had not followed the quinary system of that time.

He was invited to join Charles Darwin on the voyage of the Beagle but he declined it. On Darwin's return, the collection of mammals and beetles was entrusted to him. In November 1843 he became an assistant in the mineralogical department of the British Museum of Natural History. He became keeper in 1851 upon the death of Charles Konig and held the position until his retirement in 1880.

He was married to Elizabeth Ann, daughter of musician G. L. J. Griesbach of Windsor, on 21 December 1834. One of their daughters married the entomologist and writer Edward Caldwell Rye. He died at Putney on 21 January 1888.

He had three sons (Charles Owen Waterhouse, Frederick Herschel Waterhouse, and Edward Alexander Waterhouse), all coleopterists, and three daughters.

Waterhouse was the author of A natural history of the Mammalia (1846–48). The work was begun in 1844 was done slowly as the original French publisher M. Hippolyte Baillière was unable to take it up. The two volumes covered the marsupials and the rodents. The famous Archaeopteryx specimen was acquired when he was curator. Amongst the numerous species he described are the numbat (Myrmecobius fasciatus), and the Syrian or golden hamster (Mesocricetus auratus). He also assisted Louis Agassiz with his Nomenclator Zoologicus (1842).

== Publications ==
- Charles Darwin, ed. (1839), The Zoology of the Voyage of H.M.S. Beagle during the years 1832-1836., vol. Part II: Mammalia, London: Smith, Elder & Co
- Waterhouse, George R. (1845), "Descriptions of Colepterous Insects collected by Charles Darwin, Esq., in the Galapagos Islands", Annals and Magazine of Natural History, 16 (102): 19–41, doi:10.1080/037454809494527
- A Natural History of the Mammalia, vol. I: Marsupiata, or Pouched Animals, London: Hippolyte Bailliere, 1846
- A Natural History of the Mammalia, vol. II: Rodentia, or Gnawing Mammalia, London: Hippolyte Bailliere, 1848
