= Society for the Overseas Settlement of British Women =

British organisation, 1919–1964

- Predecessor: United British Women's Emigration Association; Colonial Intelligence League; South African Colonisation Society
- Successor: Women's Migration and Overseas Appointments Society
- Formation: 1919
- Dissolved: 1964
- Secretary: Isabel Crowdy
- Publicity Officer: Meriel Talbot

The Society for the Overseas Settlement of British Women (SOSBW, 1919–1964) was a British organisation to encourage women's emigration from the United Kingdom to dominions of the British Empire.

== History ==
The Society for the Overseas Settlement of British Women (SOSBW) was established in December 1919, combining the United British Women's Emigration Association, the Colonial Intelligence League (CIL) and the South African Colonisation Society. It encouraged women's emigration from the United Kingdom to dominions of the British Empire in order to deal with the "superfluous women problem" and ease economic hardships after World War I. Unlike the CIL, the SOSBW discouraged British women emigrants from taking up agricultural work in Canada.

The SOSBW council included representatives from the Girls' Friendly Society, the Young Women's Christian Association (YMCA), the ex-Servicewomen's Association, the Women's Labour Organisation, the Women's Catholic Emigration Society, the National Federation of General Workers, the Joint Committee of the Industrial Women's Organisation, the National Amalgamated Society of Women Workers, the Ministry of Labour and the Overseas Settlement Committee. Isabel Crowdy was the inaugural Secretary and Meriel Talbot served as Publicity Officer.

In the 1920s and 1930s, the SOSBW organised tours for schoolgirls to Canada (1928 and 1936) and Australia (1934). The tours were intended to strengthen "Empire unity" and to encourage the migration of respectable young women as "suitable stock to populate" British-based societies.

The SOSBW was renamed the Women's Migration and Overseas Appointments Society in 1962. The organisation was dissolved in 1964.
