= Stratfield Saye =

Village and parish in Hampshire, England

Coordinates: 51°21′N 1°00′W

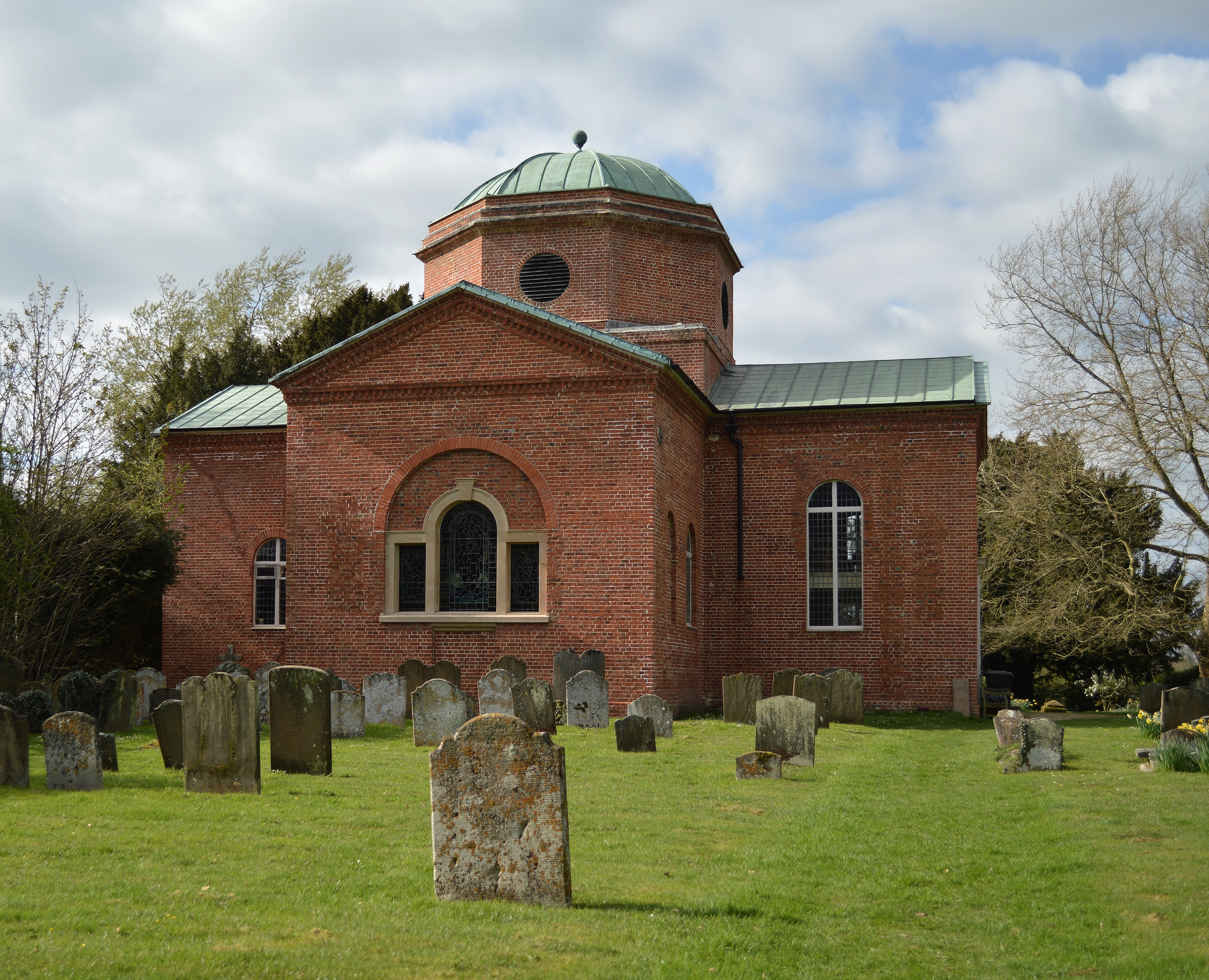
- Church of St Mary the Virgin, Stratfield Saye

- Location within Hampshire
- Area: 11.10 km^{2} (4.29 sq mi)
- Population: 285 (2021 census)
  - Density: 26/km^{2} (67/sq mi)
- Civil parish: Stratfield Saye
- District: Basingstoke and Deane
- Shire county: Hampshire
- Region: South East
- Country: England
- Sovereign state: United Kingdom

Stratfield Saye is a small village and civil parish in the Borough of Basingstoke and Deane and the English county of Hampshire. The parish includes the hamlets of West End Green, Fair Oak Green and Fair Cross. In 2021 the parish had a population of 285.

== Etymology ==
The name means 'Street-Field of the Saye family'. The street was the Devil's Highway, the Roman road from London to Calleva Atrebatum (Silchester) which forms the northern parish boundary. Some older sources use the alternative spelling Strathfieldsaye, Stratford Saye, and Stratford Sea.

Stratfield Saye House was built around 1630 as the Pitt family home, from fortunes made by Thomas "Diamond" Pitt. In the late 18th century the family were closely related to the prime ministers, William Pitt the Elder and William Pitt the Younger. It has been the home of the Dukes of Wellington since 1817.

== The church ==
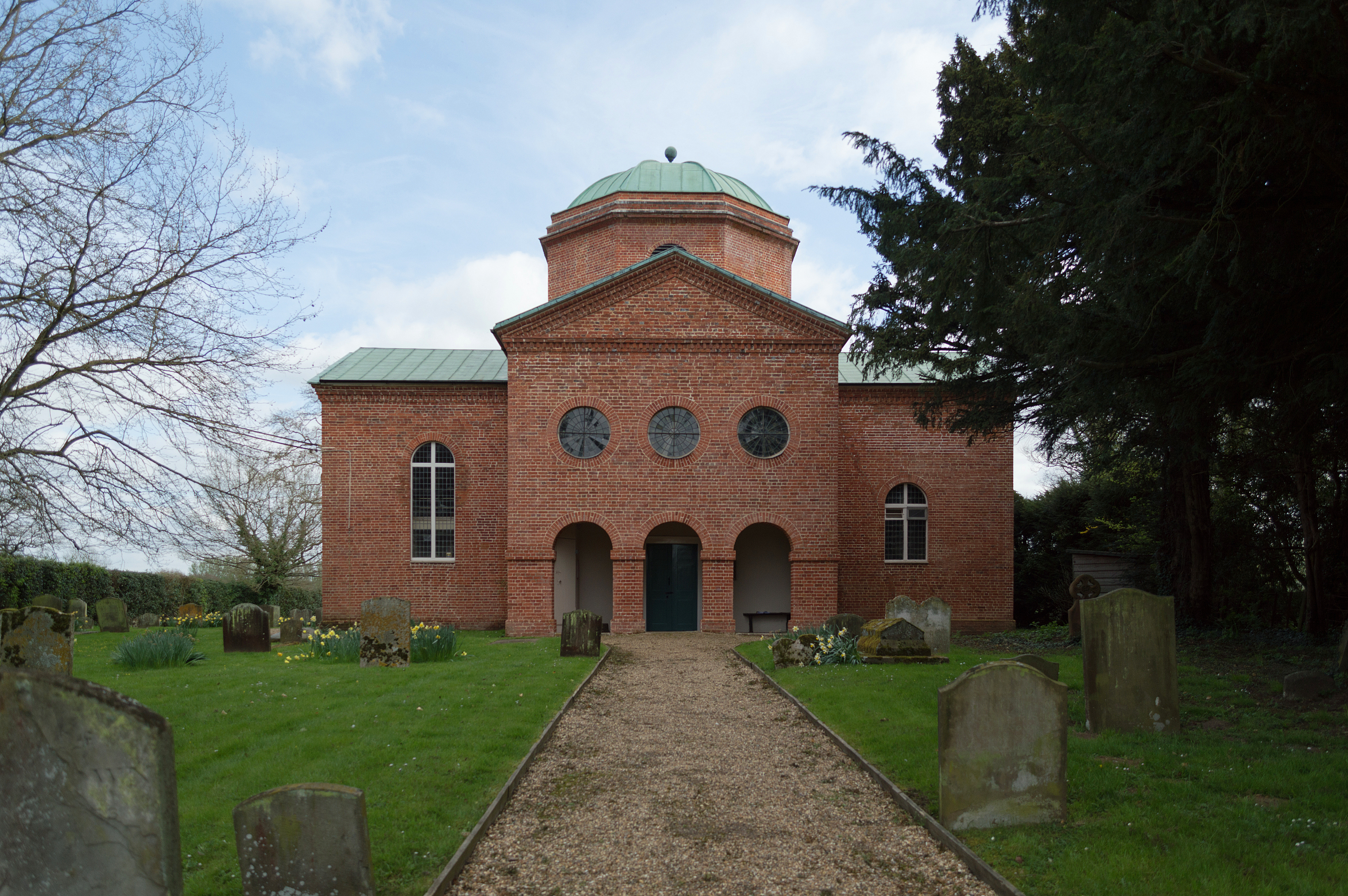
St Mary the Virgin

The parish church, near the house, is an unusual domed Georgian building with the plan of a Greek Cross. It contains memorials to the Barons Rivers and to most of the Dukes of Wellington, except the famous first duke. His funerary hatchment may, however, be seen.

James Gerald Joyce (1819–78) was rector here from 1855 until his death. His interests were in archaeology and he led excavations at Calleva Atrebatum, where he discovered the Silchester eagle in 1866. His wife Ellen Joyce was notable for her support of women emigrating to the empire.
