= Brooke Lambert =

English cleric and social reformer

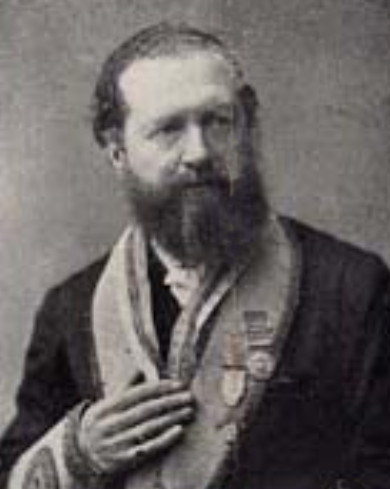
- Brooke Lambert in freemason regalia
- Born: 17 September 1834; Chertsey
- Died: 25 January 1901 (aged 66); Greenwich
- Alma mater: Brighton College; King's College London; Brasenose College
- Occupation: Anglican priest, social reformer
- Parent(s): Francis John Lambert; Catherine Wheatley

Brooke Lambert (1834–1901) was an English cleric and social reformer. He played significant roles in the Charity Organisation Society (COS) and the Metropolitan Association for Befriending Young Servants (MABYS), and as an ally of the settlement movement in London. In 1927, Clara Collet wrote that in Lambert, the reformer Charles Booth "seems to have found a kindred soul".

== Early life ==
He was born at Chertsey, Surrey, the fourth son of Francis John Lambert (1798–1876), son of Sir Henry Lambert, 4th Baronet, and his wife Catherine Wheatley. His maternal grandparents were Major-General William Wheatley of the Grenadier Guards who died during the Peninsular War, and his wife Jane Williams, a daughter of Thomas Williams of Llanidan. He was brought up in Kensington, schooled at home and by the evangelical James Compigné Chase, and was sent in 1849 to Brighton College. He then became a student at King's College, London, where he encountered F. D. Maurice and the furore over his 1853 ejection.

Lambert matriculated at Brasenose College, Oxford in 1854, graduating B.A. 1858, M.A. 1861, and B.C.L. 1863. He was ordained deacon in 1858, and became a curate later that year at Christ Church, Preston, Lancashire. He was there when he was ordained priest in 1859, by Horatio Powys. In 1860 he moved to a curacy at St John's, Worcester. In 1863, after a short time at Hillingdon, he then took another curacy, with the Rev. Robert Edward Bartlett at St Mark's Church in Whitechapel, London.

== Vicar in Whitechapel ==
Bartlett received preferment in 1865, to the parish of Pershore in Worcestershire, and Lambert replaced him as vicar of St Mark's, Whitechapel. The parish church was St Mary Matfelon, and St Mark's, which opened in 1841, was a chapel of ease for it. It was in the Goodman's Fields area of east London, between Alie Street and Prescot Street, and was demolished in 1927. At the time of its building, an initiative of Charles Blomfield, Whitechapel was a "hotbed of crime" with "one dingy church" for a population of 36,000.

Lambert addressed the social problems he found in Whitechapel in a number of ways. Shortly after he became vicar there was a local outbreak of the third cholera pandemic, and he was heavily involved in practical help and duties. He made statistical studies of what is now known as the poverty threshold, and these anticipated the work of Charles Booth. He became involved in local government: one of his published sermons, "East-London Pauperism", given in Oxford in 1868, picked out an issue with the human resources on the local boards in Whitechapel. He did not approve of solutions based on charitable relief.

After five years, however, Lambert's health broke down.

== Recuperation ==
Lambert undertook a sea voyage to the Caribbean, with his friend John Richard Green; his family owned property there. After a curacy at Rainhill, Lancashire in 1871, he was moved to Tamworth, Staffordshire as vicar. His father died in 1876. His financial circumstances—namely the possession of a private income, allowing him to take on some clerical positions without hardship—then soon changed, something attributed by the Oxford Dictionary of National Biography to a drop in prices for West Indian sugar. He sought a London position from 1878, and in 1880 was given the crown living of Greenwich by W. E. Gladstone.

== Vicar of Greenwich ==
Moving to the Greenwich vicarage in 1880, Lambert played a full part in charity and educational organisation in the large parish for nearly 20 years. In poor health, he made a lengthy African journey from 1899. He died at the vicarage on 25 January 1901, unmarried, was cremated, and his ashes were buried at Shoeburyness.

== Voluntary organisations and campaigning ==
Lambert was for 15 years involved in the Social Science Association, as secretary to its education section. He was in the founding group of the Cremation Society.

The Charity Organisation Society was founded in 1869, and Lambert became a significant early member. In 1892, the COS Council heard a paper by Thomas Mackay arguing against old age pensions. Lambert spoke on the other side of the question, suggesting that a reasonable pension proposal, such as Booth's five shilling a week figure, would take up an idea backed by much public opinion, and could put the issue out of reach of the socialist left. He became chairman of the Metropolitan Association for Befriending Young Servants in 1880, a position he held for the rest of his life. On behalf of MABYS, he was a spokesman in the campaign of the 1880s to relax parental rights.

The anonymous pamphlet The Bitter Cry of Outcast London appeared in 1883, written by Andrew Mearns. It caused a public debate on slum housing, and drew wide publicity. It also proved a catalyst for the settlement movement, based on ideas already raised in discussions by Lambert, with Samuel Augustus Barnett and others. Lambert contributed to the debate, writing 1883 articles "London Landowners, London Improvements, and the Housing of the Poor" and ""The Outcast Poor. I. Esau's Cry". In 1884 Lambert moved for the formation of a Society for the Promotion of Industrial Villages, based on the ideas of Henry Solly.

== Associations ==
Lambert belonged to a group considering that curates should not be treated as "ecclesiastical butlers". It included also his Brasenose contemporary John Oakley and Harry Jones (1823–1900); with sympathisers F. D. Maurice, Andrew Kennedy Hutchison Boyd and Phillips Brooks. Jones in his memoirs placed it during the time when he was at St Mark's, Mayfair, so in the period 1852–1857, a "curate's clerical club" that became a well-attended dining club, with Maurice and Arthur Penrhyn Stanley. Lambert is regarded as a disciple of Maurice and Stanley, and was a professed Christian Socialist. Thomas Hughes named Lambert and Harry Jones, with Maurice, Stanley and others, in an 1878 list of "theological liberals" in the generally conservative Church of England. In campaigning for free education in south-east London, during the 1880s, Lambert encountered much conservative opposition; an ally was Russell Wakefield, then at Sydenham.

Lambert was one of a small number of Church of England priests who worked in the most deprived areas of London, in the third quarter of the 19th century—before the social issues reached a peak of attention. Others were John Richard Green, Edwards Comerford Hawkins and Charles Lowder.

John Ruskin met in 1867 with the layman Edward Denison, Green, then at St Philip's, Stepney, and Lambert, to discuss "what could be done for the poor." Lambert's take on a settlement or colony to help Denison's plan was for men to move in, become rate payers, and so strengthen the local boards which were his particular concern. The Methodist John Scott Lidgett, when still young, met with Green and Lambert, and discussed the same topic on the poor.

In 1876 Kate Potter, assisting Octavia Hill, met Lambert and Annie Townsend, secretary of MABYS, while collecting rents in the East End. A social relationship was struck up. Sidney Webb, Potter's brother-in-law from 1892, consulted Lambert as an expert on the Poor Law (mentioned with Samuel Augustus Barnett and William Mitchell Acworth, 1890 letter to Beatrice Potter).

== Works ==
- Pauperism (1871)
- Sermons and Lectures (1902), edited with a memoir by Ronald Bayne
