= Henrietta Barnett =

English social reformer (1851–1936)

Dame Henrietta Barnett DBE
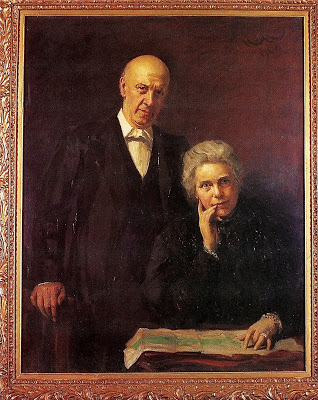
- Samuel and Henrietta Barnett portrait by Hubert von Herkomer in Toynbee Hall
- Born: Henrietta Octavia Weston Rowland; 4 May 1851; Clapham, London, England
- Died: 10 June 1936 (aged 85); Hampstead, London, England
- Occupations: Humanitarian, educator, author
- Spouse: Samuel Barnett

Dame Henrietta Octavia Weston Barnett, DBE (née Rowland; 4 May 1851 – 10 June 1936) was an English social reformer, educationist, and author. She and her husband, Samuel Augustus Barnett, founded the first "University Settlement" at Toynbee Hall (in the East End of London) in 1884. They also worked to establish the model Hampstead Garden Suburb in the early 20th century.

== Early life ==
Born in Clapham, London, Henrietta Octavia Weston Rowland lost her mother (Henrietta Monica Margaretta Ditges) at an early age. Her father, Alexander William Rowland, a wealthy businessman associated with the Macassar Oil Company, raised her and seven siblings at their London home and a country house in Kent, where she developed a lifelong appreciation of country pursuits. One of her sisters was the philanthropist Alice Hart.

At age 16, Henrietta was sent to a boarding school in Devon run by the Haddon sisters, who, influenced by James Hinton, were committed to social altruism. When her father died in 1869, Henrietta moved with two sisters to Bayswater, where she met and helped social activist and housing reformer Octavia Hill. Hill introduced Henrietta to the writings of John Ruskin, as well as many influential people similarly interested in improving the condition of London's poor.

== Marriage and activism ==
Through Hill, Henrietta met Canon Samuel Barnett, then the curate of St Mary's, Bryanston Square. They married in 1873. The newlyweds soon moved to the impoverished Whitechapel parish of St Jude's, intent on improving social conditions. Henrietta continued her parish visiting activities, with a focus on women and children, including the more than 2,000 prostitutes then active in Whitechapel alone. In 1875, Henrietta became a woman guardian for the parish, and the following year was named a school manager for the Poor Law district schools in Forest Gate. Another social initiative which the Barnetts helped set up was the Metropolitan Association for Befriending Young Servants (1876), with Jane Senior; the organisation aimed to prevent girls from becoming prostitutes, criminals or alcoholics, and provided domestic servants. The Barnetts' experiment in sending slum children for country holidays grew into the Children's Fresh Air Mission (Off to the Country), established in 1877, becoming the Children's Country Holidays Fund in 1884. Henrietta Barnett promoted Homes for Workhouse Girls starting in 1880, and founded the London Pupil Teachers Association in 1891. She also served as vice-president of the National Association for the Welfare of the Feeble-Minded (1895) and National Union of Women Workers (1895–96), as well as Hon. Secretary of the State Children's Aid Association.

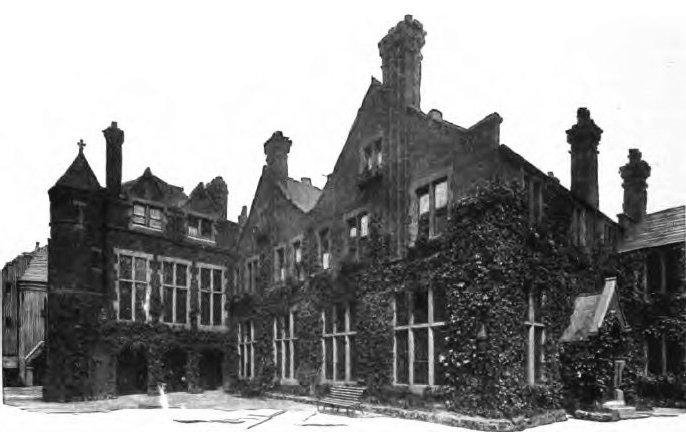
Toynbee Hall 1902

In 1884, the Barnetts established (and began living at) Toynbee Hall, a pioneering university settlement named after the recently deceased distinguished historian Arnold Toynbee, who had advocated education of the working classes and reduction of the division between social classes. In 1897 annual loan exhibitions of fine art began at the nearby Whitechapel Gallery through the Barnetts' efforts. In 1903 Richard Tawney began working with them, the Children's Country Holiday Fund, and the Workers' Educational Association. William Beveridge and Clement Attlee also worked with the Barnetts as they started their own careers. A visit to Toynbee Hall inspired Jane Addams to found Hull House in Chicago.

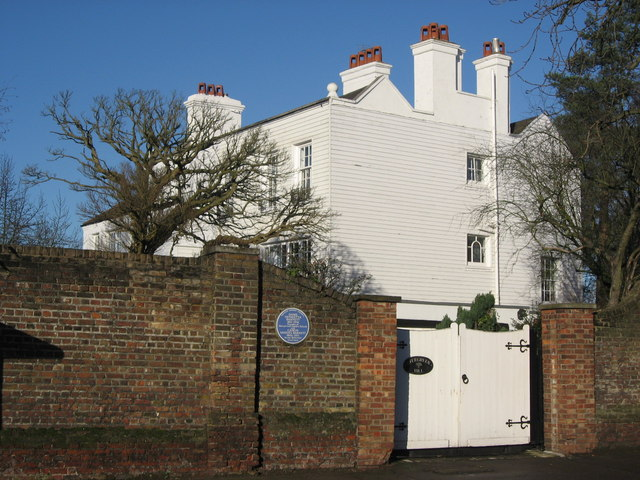
Evergreen Hill, Spaniards Road

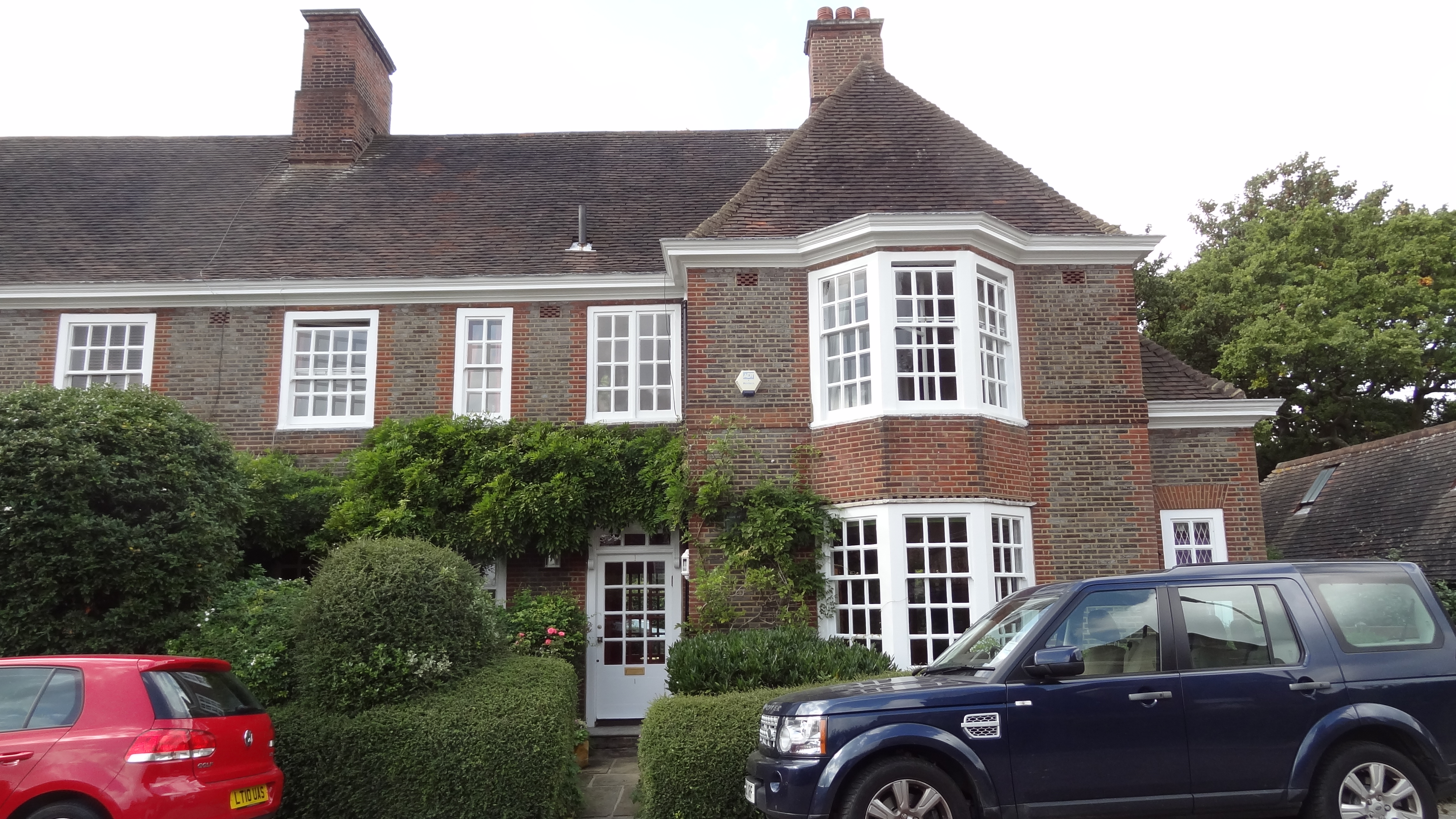
1 South Square, Hampstead Garden Suburb, former home of Henrietta Barnett

In 1889 the activist couple acquired a weekend home at Spaniard's End in the Hampstead area of north-west London. The Barnetts became inspired by Ebenezer Howard and the model housing development movement (then exemplified by Letchworth garden city). Building on the principles of Toynbee Hall, Henrietta had a vision of a garden community where all classes could live together in a light and airy environment, with beautifully designed housing and gardens, as well as protecting part of nearby Hampstead Heath from development by Eton College. She began by establishing a committee to protect part of nearby Hampstead Heath from development by Eton College, raising £43,000 and purchasing 80 hectares of the Heath for the public. In 1904, they established trusts which bought 243 acres of land along the newly opened Northern line extension to Golders Green. This became the Hampstead Garden Suburb, a model garden city developed through their efforts and those of architects Raymond Unwin and Sir Edwin Lutyens and which ultimately grew to encompass over 800 acres. In 1909, an adult education institute opened in the middle of the new Hampstead Garden Suburb, with cultural programmes and discussion groups. Soon a school for girls was established and named the Henrietta Barnett School.

== Writing ==
Barnett wrote several books, alone and with her husband. Their Christian Socialist beliefs are set out in Practicable Socialism (1889) and Toward Social Reform (1909).

Her early books concerned domestic issues: The Making of the Home (1885), How to Mind the Baby, (1887) and, written with her husband and Ernest Abraham Hart (her brother-in-law), The Making of the Body (1894). With Kathleen Mallam, Henrietta Barnett also edited a collection of essays entitled Destitute, Neglected, and Delinquent Children (Pan-Anglican papers, 1908). After her husband's death, Henrietta Barnett finished their Illustrated British Ballads Old and New (1915), wrote his multi-volume biography, Canon Barnett: his life, work and friends (1918) as well as published collections of essays, most notably Matters that Matter (1930).

== Honours ==
For her work as a social reformer, Barnett was named a Commander of the Order of the British Empire in 1917, and elevated to Dame Commander of the Order of the British Empire (DBE) in the 1924 Birthday Honours. In 1920, she was named honorary president of the 480-member American Federation of Settlements.

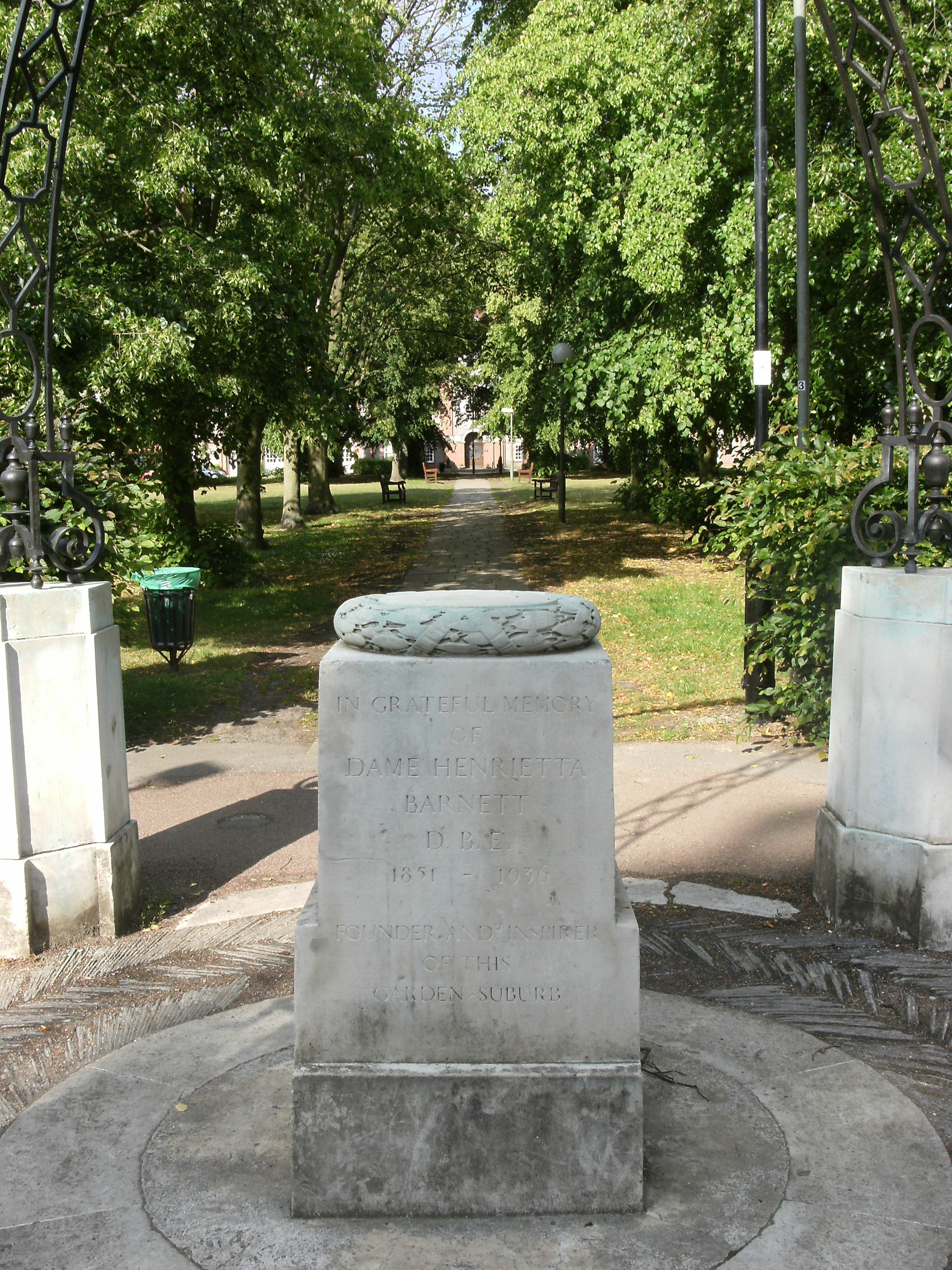
Dame Henrietta Barnett memorial, Hampstead Garden Suburb, London NW11

== Death and legacy ==
For the final dozen years of her life, Henrietta Barnett took up painting and often lived at 45 Wish Road, Hove (today marked by a blue plaque).

She died at Hampstead in 1936 (aged 85) and is buried (with Samuel) in the churchyard of St Helen's Church, Hangleton, East Sussex.

Henrietta is remembered (with Samuel) in the Church of England with a commemoration on 17 June.

== Published works ==
- Barnett, Henrietta Rowland (1885). The Making of the Home. A reading-book of domestic economy for school and home use. London: Cassell and Company.
- Barnett, Henrietta Rowland (1894). The Making of the Body. A children's book on anatomy and physiology : for school and home use. London: Longmans, Green.
- Barnett, Henrietta O. (Mrs. S. A. Barnett) (1881). The Work of the Lady Visitors: Written For The Council of the Metropolitan Association for Befriending Young Servants . London: Penny and Hull.
- Barnett, Henrietta O. (Mrs. S. A. Barnett) (1879). The Young Women In Our Work Houses . London: Penny and Hull.
- Barnett, Samuel Augustus; Barnett, Henrietta Rowland (1888). Practicable Socialism: Essays on Social Reform (1st ed.). London: Longmans, Green & Co.
  - Barnett, Samuel Augustus; Barnett, Henrietta Rowland (1895). Practicable Socialism: Essays on Social Reform (2nd ed.). London: Longmans, Green & Co.
  - Barnett, Samuel Augustus; Barnett, Henrietta Rowland (1915). Practicable Socialism: Essays on Social Reform (New Series ed.). London: Longmans, Green & Co.
- Barnett, Samuel Augustus; Barnett, Henrietta Rowland (1909). Towards Social Reform. London: T. Fisher Unwin.
- Barnett, Henrietta Rowland (1919). Canon Barnett: His Life, Work, and Friends. Houghton Mifflin.
- Barnett, Henrietta Rowland (1930). Matters that Matter. London: J. Murray.
