= John Hughes (1790–1857) =

John Hughes (2 January 1790 – 13 December 1857) was an English writer.

== Life ==
Born 2 January 1790, he was the only child of Thomas Hughes, D.D., deputy clerk of the closet to George III and George IV, vicar of Uffington, Berkshire, and canon of St. Paul's Cathedral, by his wife Mary Anne, daughter of the Rev. George Watts, vicar of Uffington; she was an early friend of Sir Walter Scott. John Hughes was educated at Westminster School and at Oriel College, Oxford, where he graduated B.A. 1812 and M.A. 1815.

About 1820 Hughes went to live at Uffington, but on the death of his father, thirteen years later, moved to Donnington Priory, Berkshire. He died at Brompton on 13 December 1857, aged 67.

== Works ==
Hughes's main publications were:

- An Itinerary of Provence and the Rhone made during the year 1819, with etchings by the author, London, 1822, noted by Scott in the preface to Quentin Durward; and
- an edition of The Boscobel Tracts, Edinburgh and London, 1830; 2nd edit. Edinburgh and London, 1857.

Hughes was known as a scholar and linguist, draughtsman and wood-carver. He gained an Oxford prize for Latin verse, and recited an English ode when the Duke of Wellington and the united sovereigns visited Oxford in 1814. He was the author of the macaronic Oriel grace-cup song Exultet mater Oriel. He also published Lays of Past Days, 1850, an ode recited in the Theatre, Oxford, 1814; and Pompeii (an ode) [1820?].

Views in the South of France (1825) engraved by William Bernard Cooke contained illustrations after sketches made by Hughes.

== Family ==
Hughes married, 14 December 1820, Margaret Elizabeth, second daughter of Thomas Wilkinson, of Stokesley Hall, Yorkshire; they had a family of six sons and one daughter. The second son was the author Thomas Hughes who wrote an account of the eldest son, George Edward Hughes of Donnington Priory, in Memoir of a Brother; it contains some of John Hughes's letters to his sons. The daughter became known as the administrator Jane Senior.

== Notes ==
Attribution

This article incorporates text from a publication now in the public domain: Lee, Sidney, ed. (1891). "Hughes, John (1790-1857)". Dictionary of National Biography. Vol. 28. London: Smith, Elder & Co.
