= Edward Caldwell Rye =

English entomologist (1832–1885)

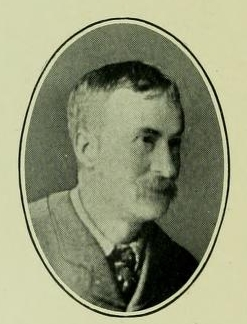

Edward Caldwell Rye (1832–1885) was an English entomologist and writer.

== Life ==
The eldest son of Edward Rye, a London solicitor with background in Norfolk, he was born at Golden Square on 10 April 1832. His siblings were Maria (b. 1829), Elizabeth (b. 1830), Edward (b. 1832), George (b. 1834), Mary Ann (b. 1837), Charles (b. 1840), Walter (b. 1843), Clara Louise (b. 1843), Clara Louisa (b. 1846) and Francis (b. 1848).

He was educated at King's College School, then, rather than going into his father's business, to which he had been articled, he studied surgery and anatomy, and then concentrated on natural history, especially entomology.

Rye was a constant contributor to The Field and Home and Colonial Mail. He was editor of the coleoptera section of the Entomologist's Annual, a founding editor of Entomologist's Monthly Magazine and editor-in-chief of the Zoological Record.

In 1874, he became librarian of the Royal Geographical Society, and became less interested in beetles, selling his collection. For some years he was honorary secretary of the geographical section of the British Association.

He married a daughter of George Robert Waterhouse, Keeper of the Palaeontological Department of the British Museum; she survived him. They had four children.

He died of smallpox on 7 February 1885, in Stockwell Hospital, aged 52.

== Works ==
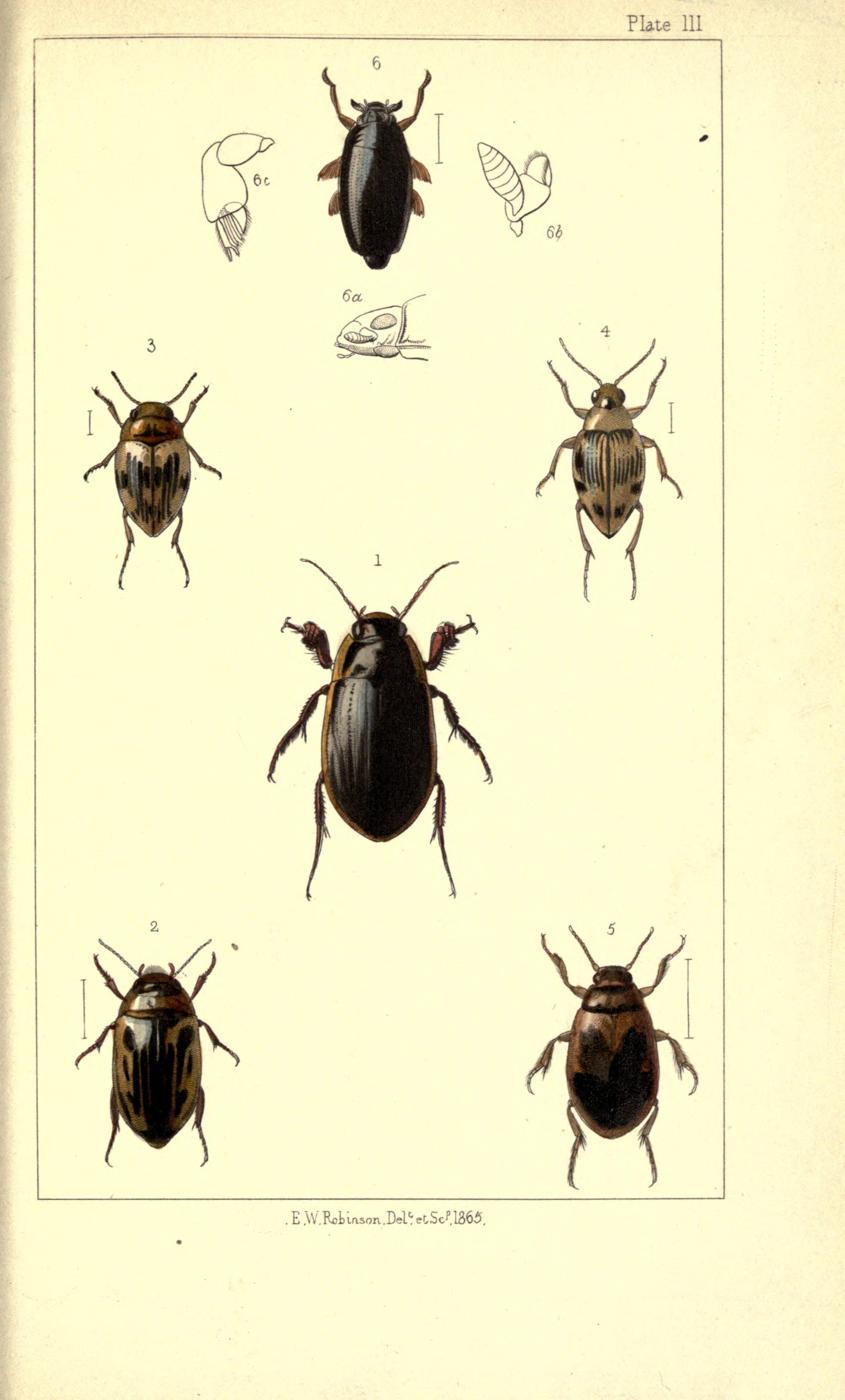
Illustration to British Beetles (1866) by Edward Caldwell Rye

Rye collected English coleoptera, to knowledge of which he added many species. He was the author of British Beetles (1866), was co-editor of the Entomologists' Monthly Magazine, and for several years was editor of the Zoological Record.

== Family ==
Rye married in 1867 Isabella Sophia Waterhouse, daughter of the naturalist George Robert Waterhouse. They had four children.
