= Rachel Crowdy =

English nurse and social reformer

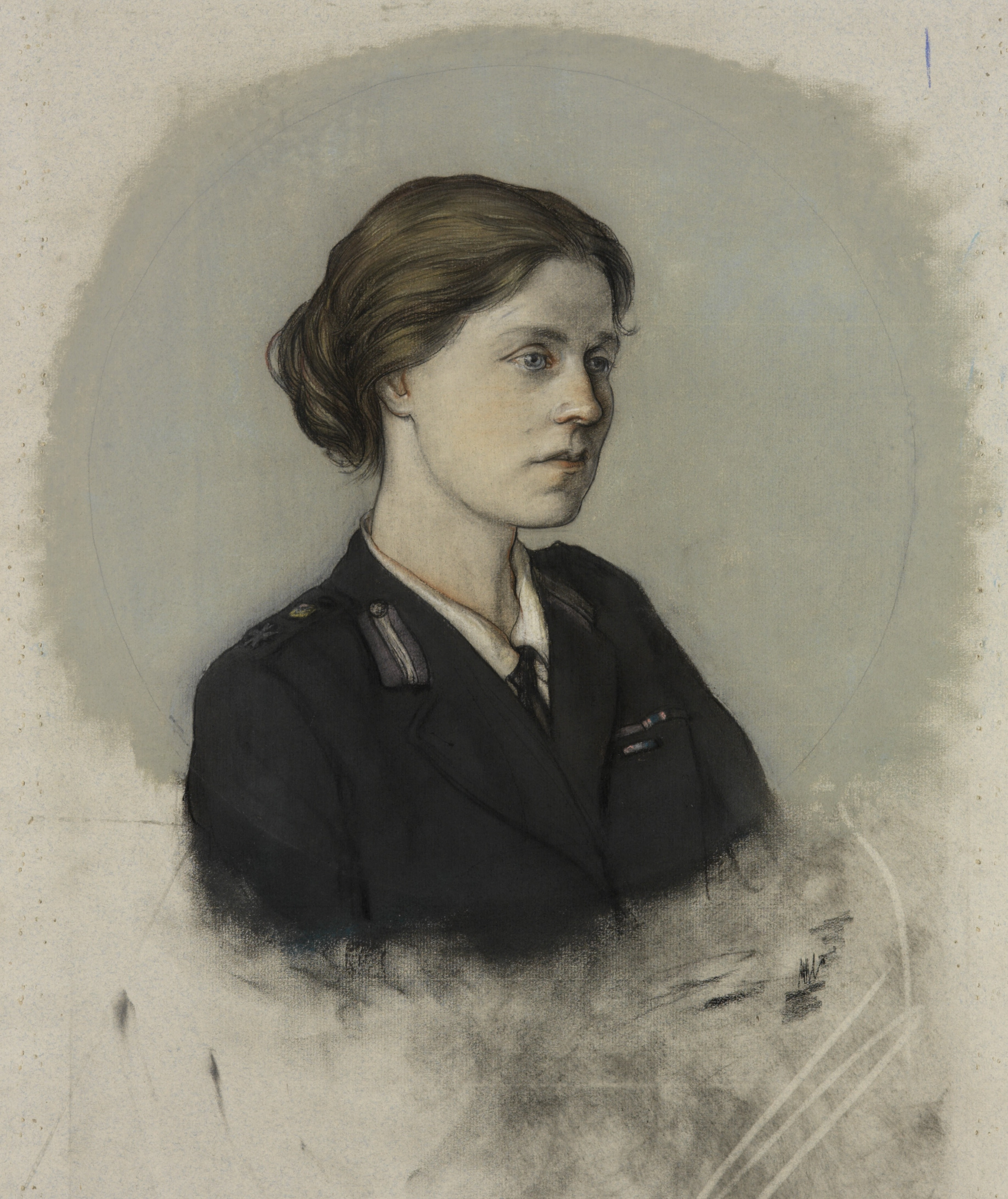
Dame Rachel Crowdy in her Voluntary Aid Detachment tunic

Dame Rachel Eleanor Crowdy, Mrs Thornhill DBE (3 March 1884, Paddington – 10 October 1964, Outwood, Surrey) was an English nurse and social reformer. She was Principal Commandant of Voluntary Aid Detachments in France and Belgium from 1914 to 1919 and Chief of the Department of Opium Traffic and Social Issues Section of the League of Nations from 1919 to 1931. She was an active member of the British National Committee for the Suppression of the White Slave Trade. She was made an honorary Doctor of Laws in 1927.

== Life ==
A daughter of James Crowdy, a solicitor from Kensington, and Mary Isabel Anne (née Fuidge), Rachel Crowdy trained as a nurse at Guy's Hospital. She met Katharine Furse in 1911, volunteering to serve as a Red Cross nurse in case of invasion. At the outset of World War I, Furse and Crowdy travelled abroad to discover what was being done for the wounded, their investigation resulting in the establishment of rest stations. Crowdy was appointed Principal Commandant of V.A.D.s in 1914. She was named Dame Commander of the Order of the British Empire in 1919.

One of her sisters, Edith, CBE, was the Deputy Director of the Women's Royal Naval Service from 1917 to 1919, while another sister, Isabel Crowdy, OBE, was the Assistant Director Inspector of Training for the same organisation. A third sister, Mary, was also awarded the CBE. Her brother was James Fuidge Crowdy, MVO.

From 1919 to 1931, Rachel Crowdy was Head of the Social Questions and Opium Traffic Section of the League of Nations, making her the only woman to be head of an administrative section of the League of Nations.

In 1920-21, she accompanied the International Typhus Commission to Poland at the height of the post-war epidemic there. On her retirement from the League, she was guest of honour at a dinner for six hundred women at the Café Royal.

In 1931, she was a member of the British delegation to the Institute of Pacific Relations conference at Shanghai. Also in 1931, it was noted in the press that she had criticised the USA for allowing eleven states to retain the legal age of marriage for girls at 12 years. She sat on the 1935-36 Royal Commission on the Private Manufacture of Armaments, visited Valencia and Madrid during the Spanish Civil War with the Parliamentary Commission in 1937, and sat on the 1938-39 Royal Commission on the West Indies.

During World War II she acted as Regions Advisor to the Ministry of Information, reporting on bomb damage in British cities.

== Marriage ==
In 1939, Crowdy married Colonel Cudbert John Massy Thornhill, CMG, DSO (born 4 October 1883 – died 12 August 1952), a British officer of the Indian Army and of The Secret Intelligence Service (MI-6).

== Death ==
Dame Rachel Crowdy, Mrs Thornhill, died at her home in Outwood, Surrey on 10 October 1964, aged 80.

== Works ==
- The League of Nations: Its Social and Humanitarian Work, The American Journal of Nursing, Vol. 28, No. 4 (April 1928)
