= Metropolitan Association for Befriending Young Servants =

UK charity, 1875 – c. 1940

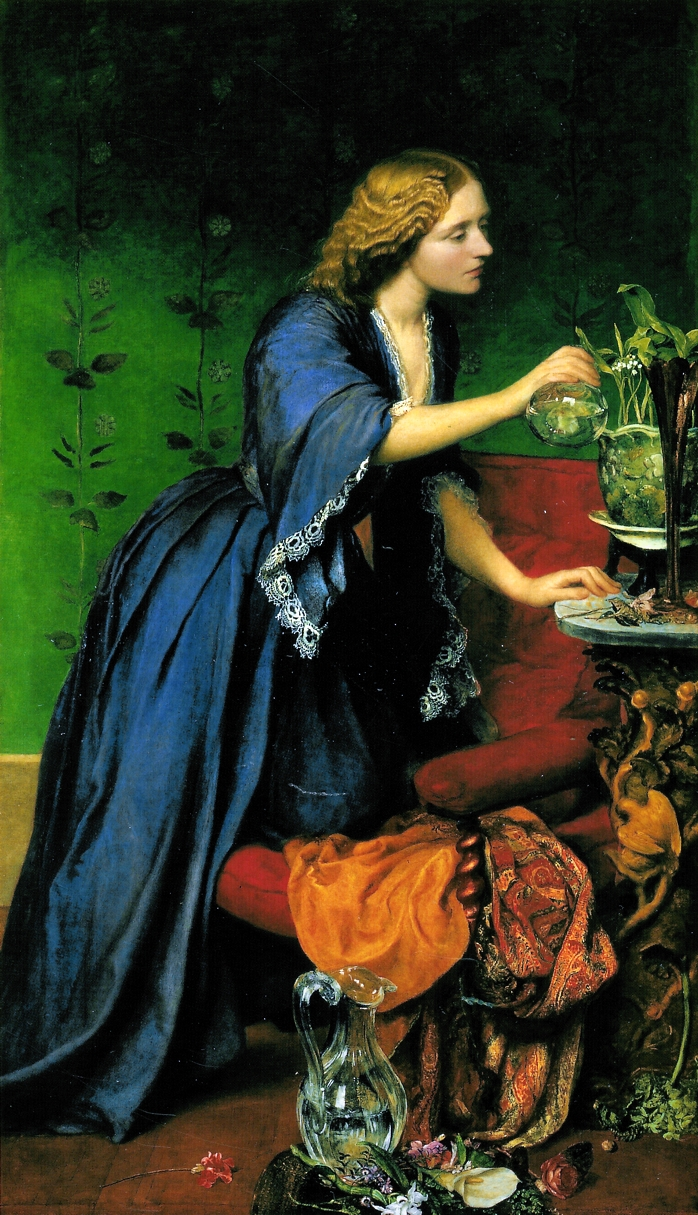
Jane Nassau Senior

The Metropolitan Association for Befriending Young Servants (MABYS) was a voluntary organisation of middle- and upper-class women, which aimed to support poor young women and girls in London and encourage them to become domestic servants.

== Foundation ==
The Oxford Dictionary of National Biography says that this organisation was founded by Caroline Emelia Stephen and her cousin. The same source says it was founded by Jane Nassau Senior, Britain's first female civil servant, and social reformer Henrietta Barnett in 1875. It was chaired from 1880 to his death in 1901 by Brooke Lambert.

== Purpose ==
The organisation aimed to support poor young women and girls in London, prevent girls from becoming prostitutes, criminals or alcoholics, and provide a steady supply of domestic servants.

The Poor Law had led to large numbers of children being taken from their families by the authorities and raised in workhouses and Poor Law schools. Children were discharged from these institutions at age 14 to survive as best they could; this practice led to severe social problems, as unqualified children turned to crime and prostitution. Until the formation of MABYS, the only formal support given to those discharged from workhouses was the offer of subsidised transport to Canada or Australia.

MABYS aimed to monitor and support girls discharged from residential institutions, in an effort to find them employment as domestic servants and discourage them from becoming prostitutes or alcoholics. MABYS volunteers would visit and befriend girls discharged from Poor Law care, providing advice and assistance with finding housing and new employment where necessary. By the 1880s MABYS had 25 branch offices and 17 associated care homes, and by the 1890s MABYS had over 1,000 volunteers, and was processing applications for employment from over 7,000 girls per year, of whom over 5,000 per year were successfully placed, around 25% of whom came from London's Poor Law schools. (Note: Between 1850 and 1900, around 30,000 children were pupils at Poor Law schools at any given time, of whom around 13,000 were girls.)

MABYS strongly discouraged contact between girls in their care and their relatives, amid concerns that children would acquire bad habits from their families, or become unsettled by relatives, who would often attempt to remove the children. Jane Nassau Senior, with the support of Thomas John Barnardo, had lobbied for MABYS, and similar bodies, to be automatically made guardians until the age of 20 for any child who had been in Poor Law care for over five years.

MABYS grew rapidly. In 1887 the Association opened a residential training centre for feeble-minded girls, aiming to find them appropriate employment, and by 1896 the Association was operating lodging-houses and training centres for unemployed women, and had expanded its remit to cover girls coming to London in search of work and girls from industrial schools.

Following social changes in the wake of the First World War MABYS went into decline, although it formally remained in existence until at least 1940. In 1948 the National Assistance Act abolished the Poor Law, and responsibility for education and training was brought under the control of the state.

== Notes and references ==
Notes

Bibliography

- Hopkins, Eric (1994), Childhood Transformed: Working-class children in nineteenth-century England, Manchester: Manchester University Press, ISBN 0-7190-3867-7, OCLC 246556967
- Kohli, Marjorie (2003), The Golden Bridge: Young immigrants to Canada, 1833-1939, Toronto: Dundurn Press, ISBN 1-896219-90-X, OCLC 52493365
- Koven, Seth (2004), Slumming: Sexual and social politics in Victorian London, Princeton, NJ: Princeton University Press, ISBN 0-691-11592-3, OCLC 53096998
- McBride, Theresa (1976), The Domestic Revolution: The modernisation of household service in England and France, 1820-1920, London: Taylor & Francis, ISBN 0-85664-220-7, OCLC 2202796
- Murdoch, Lydia (2006), Imagined Orphans, New Brunswick, NJ: Rutgers University Press, ISBN 0-8135-3722-3, OCLC 60245383
- Prochaska, F. J. (1980), Women and Philanthropy in Nineteenth-Century England, Oxford: Oxford University Press, ISBN 0-19-822627-6, OCLC 6376206
