= Edith Crowdy =

Deputy director of Women's Royal Naval Service

Edith Crowdy CBE
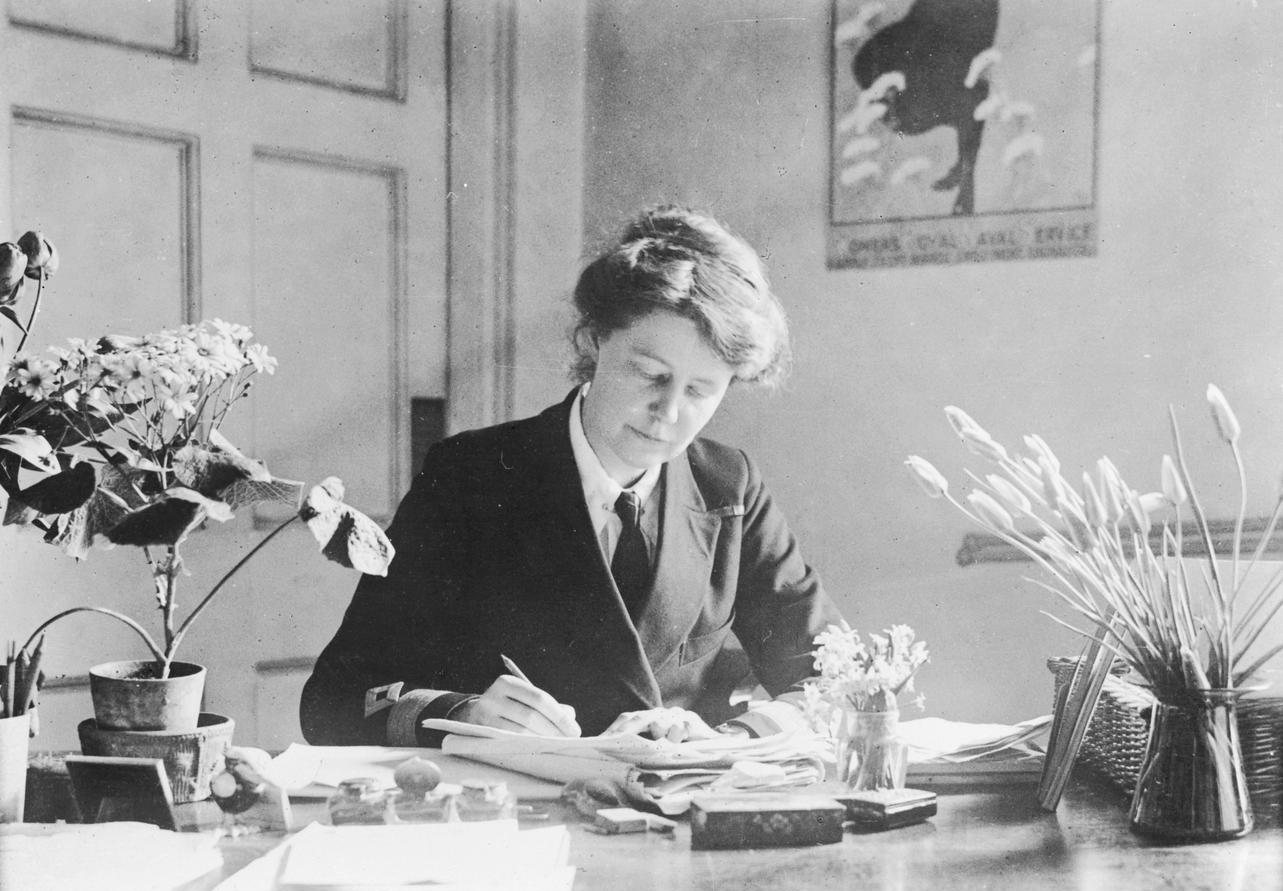
- Born: Edith Frances Crowdy; 25 August 1880; 79 Victoria Road, Wandsworth, London, UK
- Died: 23 July 1947 (aged 66) Dorchester, Dorset, England, UK
- Allegiance: United Kingdom
- Branch: Women's Royal Naval Service
- Rank: Deputy Director

Edith Frances Crowdy CBE (25 August 1880 – 23 July 1947) was the deputy director of the Women's Royal Naval Service, and served as the first general secretary of the World Association of Girl Guides and Girl Scouts.

She was born on 25 August 1880 at 79 Victoria Road, Wandsworth, London, one of the four daughters of solicitor James Crowdy and his wife, Mary Isabel Anne (née Fuidge). Of her sisters, Dame Rachel Crowdy was Principal Commandant of Voluntary Aid Detachments in France and Belgium from 1914 to 1919, and Isabel Crowdy, OBE, was the Assistant Director Inspector of Training, Women's Royal Navy Service from 1918. Her brother, James Fuidge Crowdy, MVO, was Assistant Secretary to the Governor General of Canada. Edith's remaining sister was Mary Crowdy, CBE.
