= Jane Senior =

English philanthropist and civil servant (1828-1877)

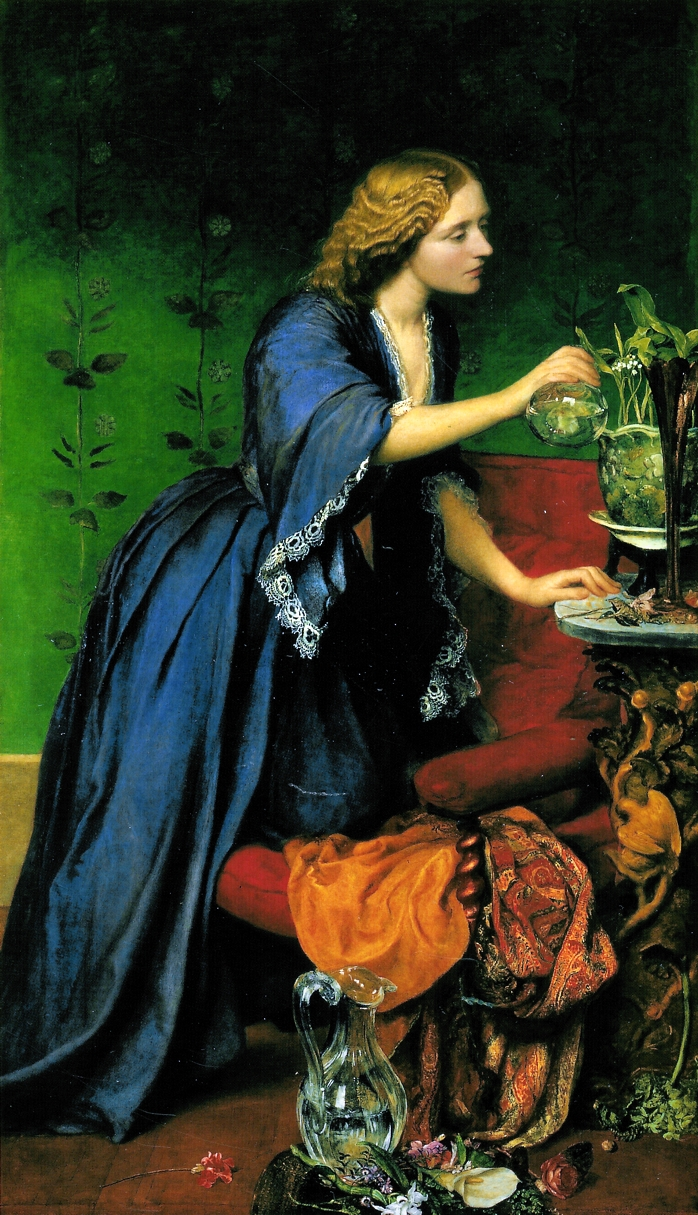
Jane Nassau Senior, in an 1859 painting by George Frederic Watts.

Jane Nassau Senior (1828–1877) was Britain's first female civil servant, and a philanthropist. She was co-founder of the Metropolitan Association for Befriending Young Servants (MABYS).

== Life ==
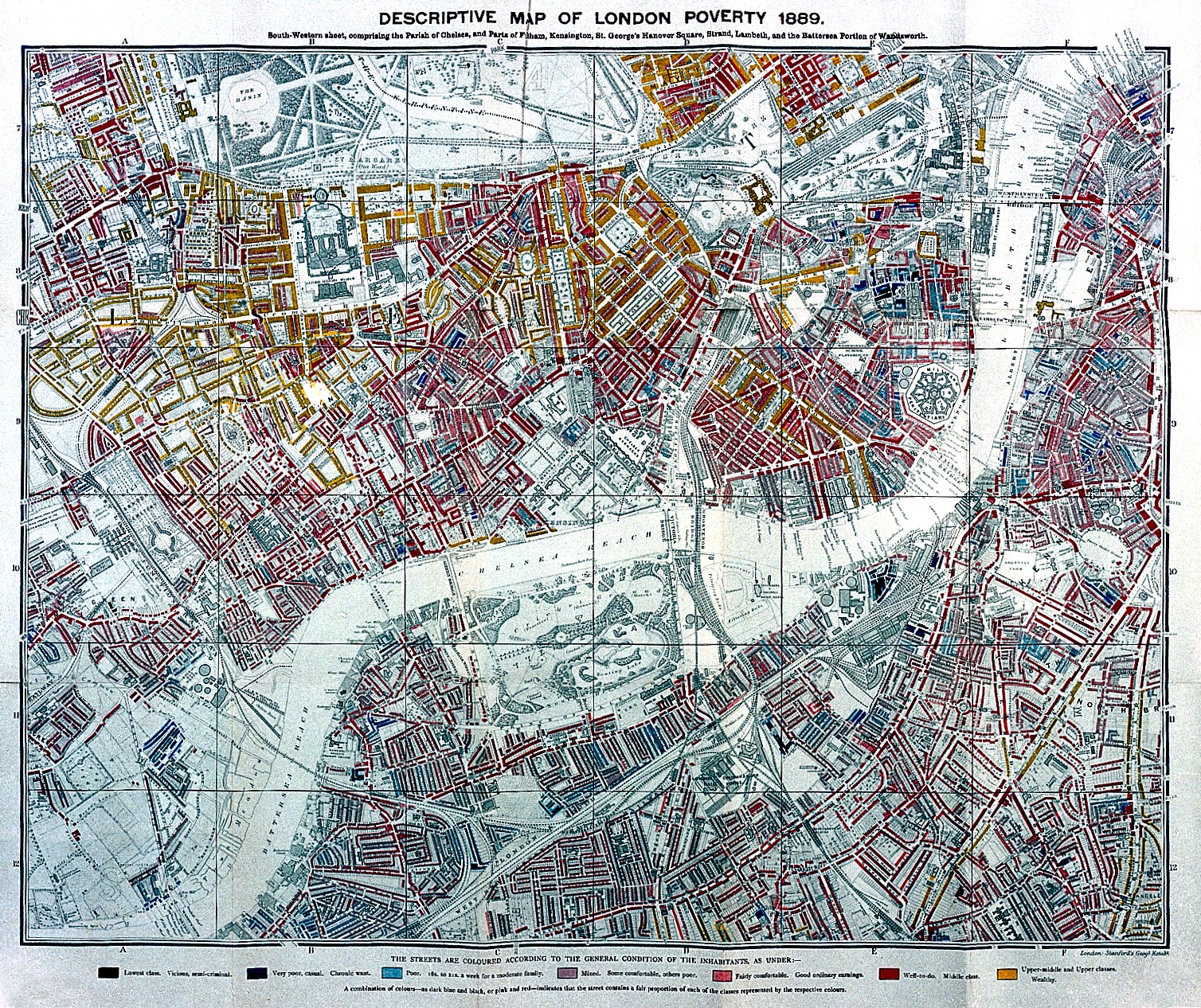
The county of Surrey, most of the metropolitan part of which is shown here south of the Thames, as it stood when it joined the new County of London in 1889. In the part shown and three parishes beyond, to the east, it contained many poor streets. These are shaded blue and black, by Charles Booth (social reformer).

Senior was born at Uffington on 10 December 1828, daughter of John Hughes and the only sister of the author Thomas Hughes and five other brothers. She was named Jane Elizabeth Hughes.

Senior did relief work to provide material aid to victims of the Franco-Prussian War of 1870, as part of the newly founded National Society for Aid to Sick and Wounded in War (which in 1905 was reconstituted as the British Red Cross). She directed many practical measures for handling donations.

Senior's work with impoverished children in Surrey led to her appointment in January 1873 as an assistant inspector of workhouses. This post was given to her by James Stansfeld, President of the Local Government Board, against civil service opposition. The goal of the post was a Civil Service Report, which Senior framed as covering both pauper girls as school children and their histories after leaving school. When the Report appeared in 1875, the 1874 general election having intervened, it was the target of heavy criticism by a senior Royal Navy officer, Carleton Tufnell, acting in concert with The Times.

In May 1874, the Reverend Thomas Vincent Fosbery, then chaplain to Bishop Samuel Wilberforce, called a meeting at Lambeth Palace which brought together Senior, Elizabeth, wife of the Very Reverend Harold Browne, Bishop of Winchester, Catharine Tait, and Mary Elizabeth Townsend (1841–1918). They agreed to set up the Girls' Friendly Society, which was founded on 1 January 1875, with the aim of young "wholly unblemished" servants having a friend of a higher social class with whom to meet, read, sew, and take refreshment. In 1876 Senior, with Caroline Emelia Stephen and her cousin, founded the rival Metropolitan Association for Befriending Young Servants (MABYS), to habilitate institutionalised and vulnerable girls in the metropolis. Senior had not found enough common ground with the GFS's senior Anglicans, who used the geographical parishes of the church, some of whom insisted on no hint a servant's impropriety. Instead, her more successful organisation sought to de-institutionalise recruits, from such places as workhouses, into becoming reliable, skilled servants. Senior, with the support of Thomas John Barnardo, had lobbied for MABYS, and similar bodies, to be automatically made guardians until the age of 20 of any child who had been in Poor Law care for over five years.

Senior died of 'cancer of the womb' and exhaustion on 24 March 1877, aged 48; and is buried in Brookwood Cemetery in Surrey.

== Associations ==
G. F. Watts the artist had become a confidant of Jane Senior by the mid-1850s; they corresponded, and most of the letters have been destroyed. Octavia Hill, governess for a time to the children of Thomas Hughes, became a close friend. Senior was a friend and correspondent of the novelist George Eliot

In Clapham, Senior knew Marianne Thornton, figure of the Clapham Sect and daughter of Henry Thornton, and her niece Henrietta Synnot, both of whom were involved in local schooling. Synnot became her assistant. Caroline Stephen made a very positive impression, and was an influence for the future. In the aftermath of the "Eyre controversy", she made a point of inviting Emelia Russell Gurney, wife of Russell Gurney, to show her Jamaica sketches.

In the early 1870s Senior worked with Henrietta Rowland, teaching literacy in Whitechapel. Another associate of this period was Menella Bute Smedley, following up on girls who had left workhouse schools. For MABYS, Senior called on Bessie Belloc, Barbara Bodichon and Mrs. Knox for support.

== Family ==
Jane married Nassau John Senior, son of Nassau William Senior, on 10 August 1848 at Shaw Church. Her husband was a barrister, but failed to make more than a desultory career in the law. From 1860 they lived in Elm House, a villa with a small wooded estate on Lavender Hill, near Clapham Junction in Battersea, south London, taking lodgers.

The marriage was unhappy. They had a son Walter Nassau (1850–1933). He married Mabel Barbara Hammersley, daughter of Hugh Hammersley and his mother's friend Dulcibella Eden, in 1888.

Dorothea Murray Hughes (1891–1952), daughter of Senior's brother Hastings Hughes, was a nurse and aid worker. She wrote Jane Elizabeth Senior: A Memoir (1915).
