= Walter Rye =

British athlete and antiquary

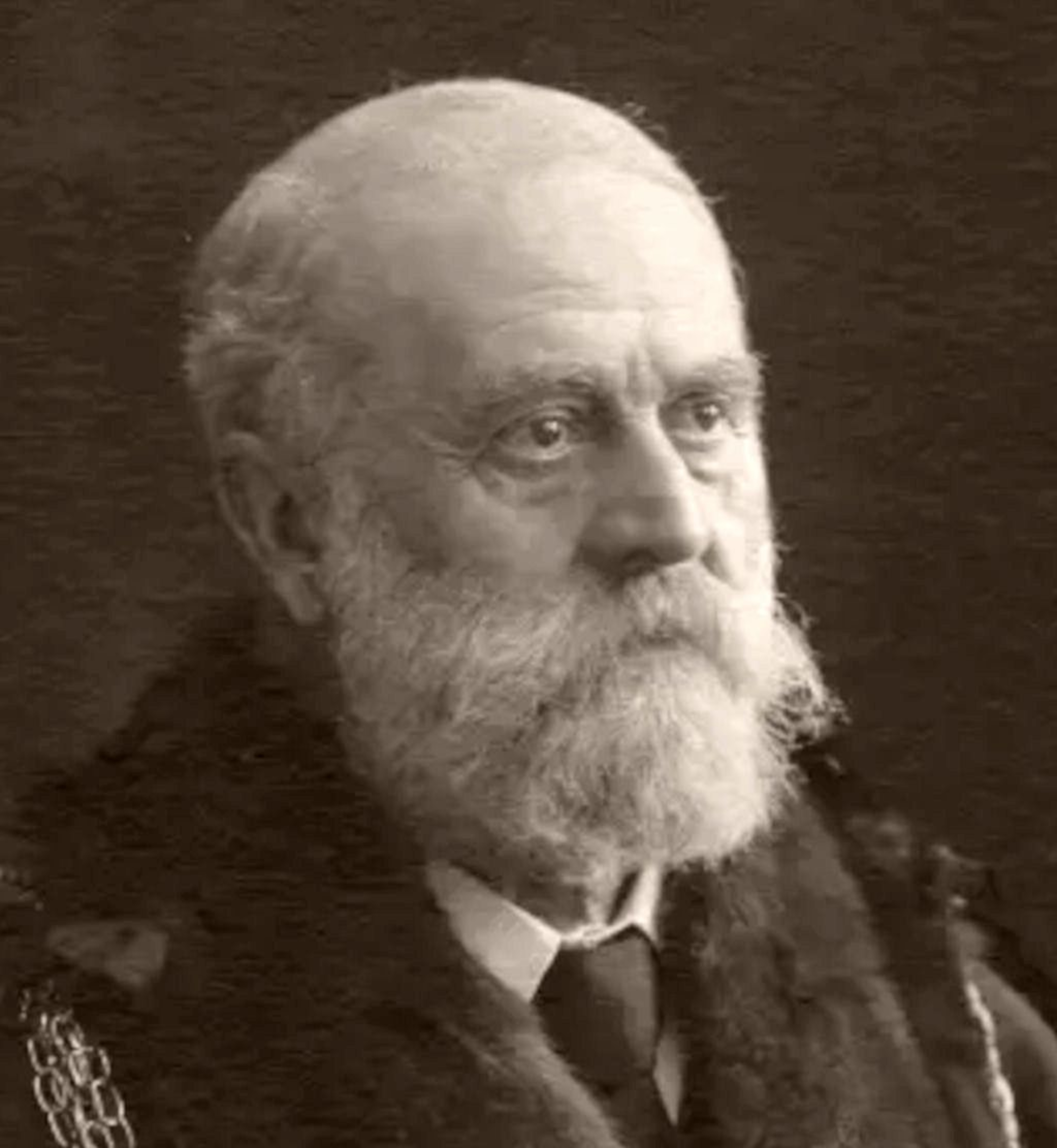
- Rye, in 1908

Personal information
- Born: 31 October 1843 Chelsea, London
- Died: 24 February 1929 (aged 85) Norwich, England
- Occupations: solicitor; antiquary; historian; writer

Sport
- Sport: Athletics
- Event: 7 miles walk
- Club: London Athletic Club

Walter Rye (31 October 1843 – 24 February 1929) was a British solicitor, athlete and antiquary, who wrote over 80 works on Norfolk.

== Early life ==
Walter Rye was born on 31 October 1843 in Chelsea, London. He was the seventh child of Edward Rye (1803-1876), a solicitor and bibliophile, and his wife, Maria Rye née Tuppen (1804-1882). Walter's siblings were Maria (b. 1829), Elizabeth (b. 1830), Edward (b. 1832), George (b. 1834), Mary Ann (b. 1837), Charles (b. 1840), Clara Louise (b. 1843), Clara Louisa (b. 1846) and Francis (b. 1848). His sister, Maria Rye, was a social reformer, and his brother, Edward Caldwell Rye, was an entomologist. His grandfather was Edward Rye (1774-1843) of Baconsthorpe, Norfolk.

== Career ==
Rye was the "father" of cross country running (or paper chasing, as it was then known), being the principal founder in 1868 of the Thames Hare and Hounds, and its president until his death. He won over 100 prizes for walking, running and cycling. He also served as the athletics correspondent of the Sporting Gazette. Rye became the British 7 miles walk champion after winning the AAC Championships title at the 1868 AAC Championships.

He regularly visited Norwich throughout his life, and helped save a number of its historic buildings from destruction. He was a founder member of the Norfolk Broads Protection Society. In 1900 he retired from his career as a solicitor and settled in Norwich; and only eight years later was elected Mayor, an office he held in the year 1908–9.

== Personal life ==
Rye married Georgina Eliza Sturges in 1870: he described her as "the prettiest and pluckiest creature I have ever met". The couple had seven sons and three daughters, including the solicitor and conservative politician Frank Rye.

Rye died at his Norwich home, 66 Clarendon Road, on 24 February 1929. He is buried in the village of Lamas, Norfolk.

== Selected works ==
- Rye, Walter (1916). An Autobiography of an Ancient Athlete and Antiquary. Norwich.
- Rye, Walter. "Some historical essays chiefly relating to Norfolk". SOLO (Search Oxford Libraries Online). University of Oxford. Archived from the original on 17 May 2021.
