= Ellen Joyce =

British organiser of women's emigration from the United Kingdom

Ellen Joyce CBE CStJ
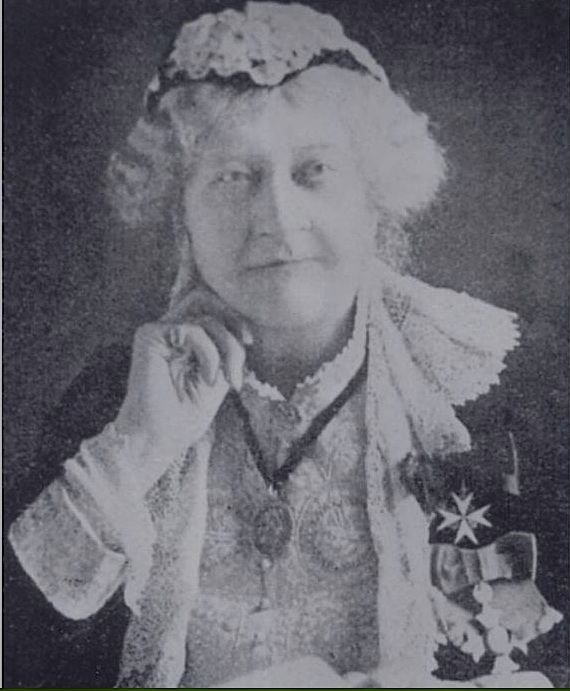
- Joyce at Bell Farm in Saskatchewan
- Born: Ellen Rice; 12 January 1832; Fairford, Gloucestershire, England
- Died: 21 May 1924 (aged 92); Winchester, Hampshire, England
- Known for: supporting the emigration of British women
- Spouse: James Gerald Joyce
- Children: Arthur Gerald Joyce
- Parent(s): Francis William Rice, 5th Baron Dynevor and Harriett Ives Barker

The Hon. Ellen Joyce CBE CStJ (née Rice, 12 January 1832 – 21 May 1924) was a British organiser of women's emigration from the United Kingdom of Great Britain and Ireland to the colonies of the British Empire. She started and ran the British Women's Emigration Association.

== Early life and family ==
Rice was born on 12 January 1832 in Fairford, Gloucestershire. She was the eldest child of Francis Rice, 5th Baron Dynevor and Harriett Ives Barker. Her younger brother was Arthur Rice, 6th Baron Dynevor. Her father was an Anglican clergyman and the vicar of Fairford.

Ellen Rice married the Reverend James Gerald Joyce (1819–78) on 20 September 1855. He was rector of Stratfield Saye in Hampshire from 1855 until his death, but his interests were in archaeology. He led excavations at the British iron age settlement Calleva Atrebatum, where he discovered the Silchester eagle in 1866. He and Ellen had one son Arthur Gerald Joyce in 1856.

== Career ==
In 1883 the Girls' Friendly Society (GFS) appointed Joyce as their "emigration correspondent". Joyce had been one of the GFS's seventy-five founding associates and she wanted to support emigration, but she was aware of the risks that girls would be exposed to while emigrating. Parties of women travelling with the GFS were given "anchor crosses" to place on their luggage.

In 1884, Joyce founded the United Englishwomen's Emigration Association. Later that year Joyce and her son Arthur accompanied 80 GFS emigrants across the Atlantic Ocean. She travelled across Canada using the Canadian Pacific Railway, which was then incomplete, but got to the western shore. When she returned she reported her success to the GFS, but her new organisation was taking off. The following year it had its own finances and by 1888 it had to change its name to the "United British Women's Emigration Association" as Scottish emigrants of the "Scotch Girl's Friendly Association" and the "Scottish YWCA" also wanted to travel under her organisation's banner.

Joyce identified who were the "right" type of emigrants and had the right to make the final decision on the suitability of candidates as the United British Women's Emigration Association's "Organising Referee." This led the organisation to send fewer women as they tried to identify the "best" emigrants who could assist in "improving" the country to which they were emigrating. Joyce led the United British Women's Emigration Association, but her role in the GFS continued. She returned to visit Canada again in 1890.

At first emigrants were bound for Canada, New Zealand and Australia but as the century ended there was growing interest in South Africa. Joyce interviewed Robert Baden-Powell for BWEA journal, The Imperial Colonist, about the need for women in South Africa in 1902, and to her regret the committee that the organisation formed to oversee the interest became independent from the BWEA as the "South African Colonisation Society" in 1903.

In July 1912, Joyce addressed the GFS Imperial Conference, stating that:

"There is no bigger attitude or higher aspiration than the be one of the Daughters of a Christian Empire. The GFS has done the very best Imperial work that has been done, sending women who have been under the highest influences from cultured, refined, religious women to become the mothers of a race, not dwarfed by poverty; or cramped by pressure as in the Nest and Nursery of the Mother-Land; but free, contended, God-fearing women in the Great Garden of the British Empire Let us enthuse others with the idea that the Empire and not the island is women's sphere. Empire building ought not to be left to accident. It is the finest, most interesting, the most satisfactory bit of work an Englishwoman can lay her hands to do."

Joyce would also speak at Church congresses noting the Christianising and moral improvement made possible by the new women emigrants sent by her organisation.

== Awards ==
In the 1920 New Year Honours, Joyce was appointed a CBE in recognition of her work as Vice-President of the British Women's Emigration Association. A fellow awardee was Grace Lefroy, the honorary secretary of the same association.

== Death ==
Joyce died in Winchester on 21 May 1924, aged 92.
