= Louisa Knightley =

British Anglican and women's rights activist

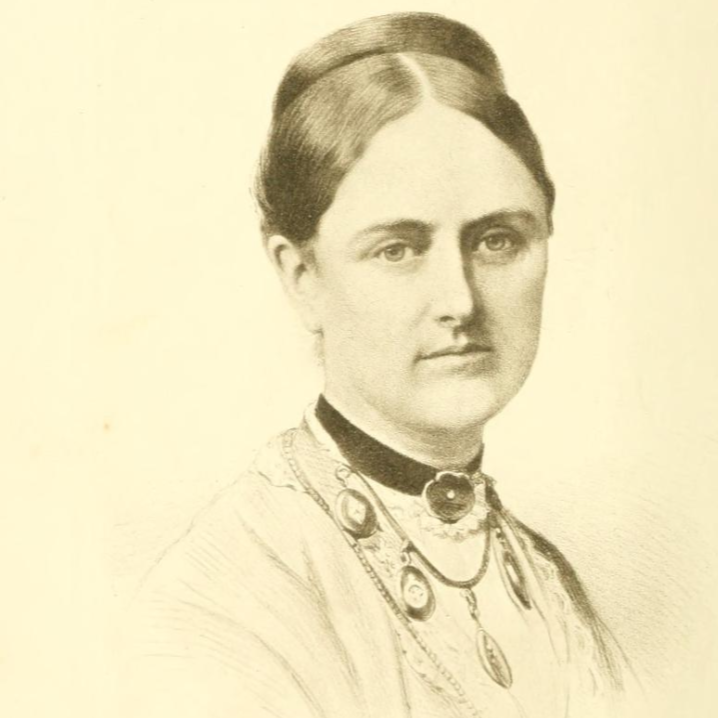
- from Louisa Knightleys 1915 book The journals of Lady Knightley of Fawsley
- Born: 25 April 1842
- Died: 2 October 1913
- Occupation: Editor

Louisa Mary Knightley, Lady Knightley (née Bowater; 25 April 1842 – 2 October 1913) was a British Anglican, politician and women's rights activist.

== Life ==
Born on Lower Grosvenor Street in London, she was the daughter of General Edward Bowater and Emilia Mary Barne. She was educated at home and kept a diary from the age of fourteen. The family were close to the British royal family, and Louisa was a lady-in-waiting at the marriage of Prince Leopold, Duke of Albany and Princess Helena of Waldeck and Pyrmont. In 1869, she married Rainald Knightley, a Conservative Party Member of Parliament twenty-three years her senior.

Knightley devoted much of her time to the church, serving as a national vice-president and the Peterborough diocese president of the Girls' Friendly Society. In 1877, she was one of the founding committee members of the Working Ladies' Guild created by Lady Mary Feilding.

She was also interest in politics, and when the Primrose League was established in 1883, she soon joined, and from 1885 until 1907, she served on its Ladies' Grand Council. In line with the organisation's aims, she was very active in mobilising women in support of the Conservative Party, and was credited with saving Rainald's seat in the 1885 and 1886 general elections. The experience of involvement in an election campaign without being able to vote convinced her of the case for women's suffrage. Around 1888, she was elected to the parish council of Badby, Northamptonshire, and later chaired the body.

Probably due to Louisa's lobbying, Rainald was created Baron Knightley in 1892, Louisa therefore becoming Lady Knightley. Rainald died in 1895, and Louisa thereafter devoted more of her time to women's rights. She was a founder member of the National Union of Women Workers, serving as a vice-president from 1906, also serving on the committee of the Freedom of Labour Defence League, and as president of the Northamptonshire Society for Promoting the Return of Women as Poor Law Guardians.

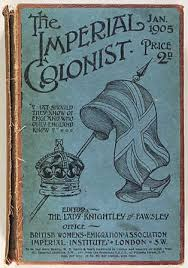
The Imperial Colonist for January 1905

Knightley was active in support of imperialism, serving as president of the South African Colonisation Society, and editing the Imperial Colonist journal from 1901 to 1913. During her last years, she served on the Northamptonshire Higher Education Committee, and, from 1908 to 1910, was the founding president of the Conservative and Unionist Women's Franchise Association.

== Honours ==
Lady Knightley was appointed a Lady of Grace of the Order of St John of Jerusalem on 7 March 1900.

== Primary source ==
- The Journals of Lady Knightley of Fawsley (full text via the Wayback Machine)

Party political offices
Preceded by New position	President of the Conservative and Unionist Women's Franchise Association; 1908–1910	Succeeded by Countess of Selborne
