= Girls' Friendly Society =

British charitable organisation

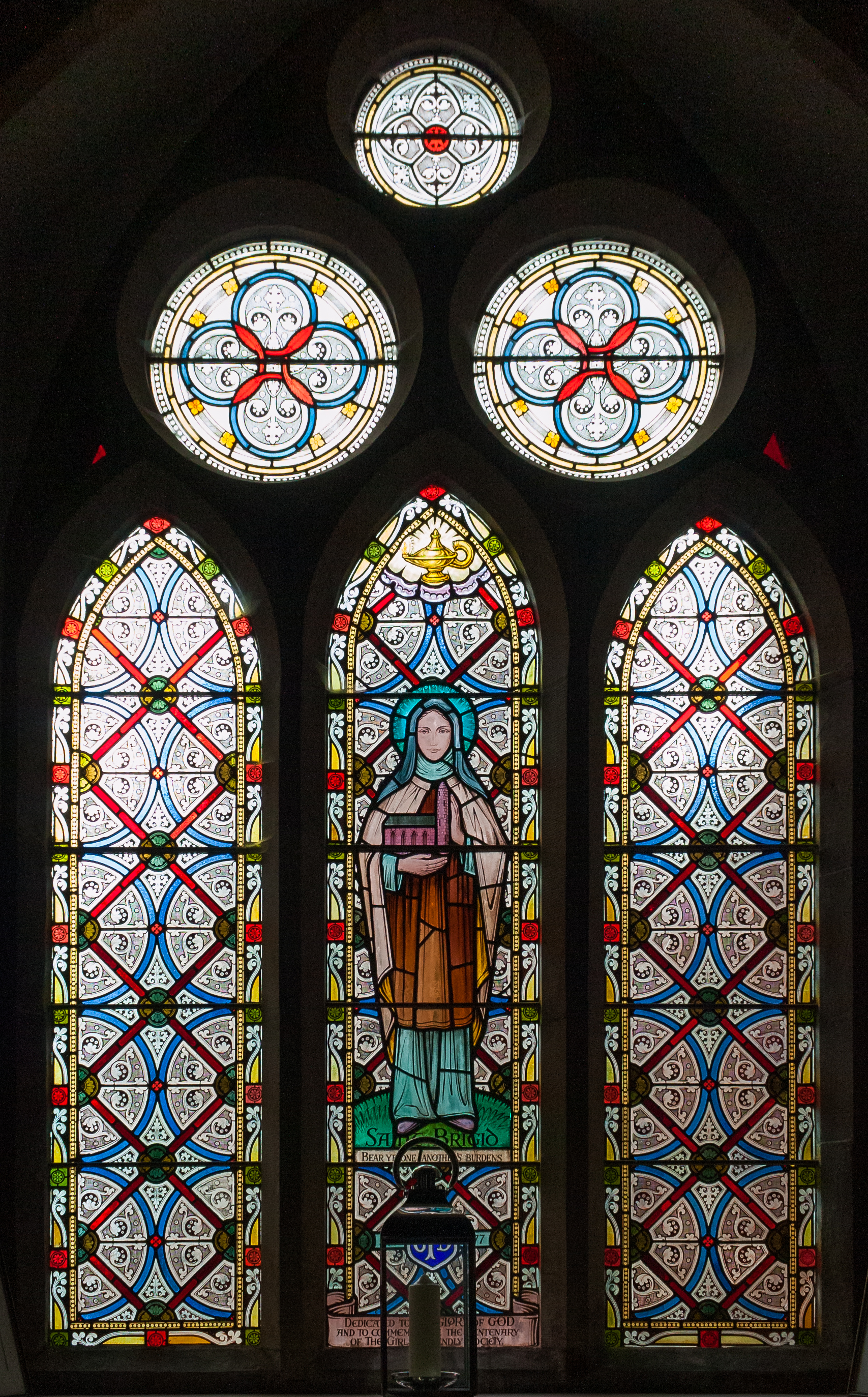
Stained glass window in St. Patrick's Church, Ballymena, County Antrim, Northern Ireland, commemorating the centenary of the Girls' Friendly Society

The Girls' Friendly Society (GFS) is a charitable organisation that empowers girls and young women aged 5 to 25, encouraging them to develop their full potential through programs that provide training, confidence building, and other educational opportunities. It was originally established by a group of Anglican women in England in 1875 to address, through Christian values, the problems of working-class unmarried girls and young women who wished to better themselves.

The main organisation, GFS England & Wales, ended its relationship with the Church of England in the early 2000s, now operating a secular model that supports girls and young women of all religions and none.

== History ==
=== Beginnings ===
In May 1874, the Reverend Thomas Vincent Fosbery (chaplain to Bishop Samuel Wilberforce), together with Mary Elizabeth Townsend (1841–1918), Catharine Tait (1819–1878), Elizabeth Browne (wife of the bishop of Winchester), and Jane Senior (1828–1877), met at Lambeth Palace and agreed on the basis for establishing the Girls' Friendly Society, which officially began its work on 1 January 1875. "The original rough plan of the Society's work and aim was written down in pencil in a tiny notebook in 1872", Mary Elizabeth Townsend wrote in 1882 recalling her original concept. She shared her concept with Fosbery who had encouraged her in her previous charitable work with working-class women. Fosbery introduced her to the older women with whom they formed the original steering committee. Mary Elizabeth Townsend was the first president of the GFS and served as such through 1882. She was succeeded by Lady Grey who served from 1883 through 1889, when Townsend again resumed the presidency from 1890 through 1892. Mary Sidgwick Benson, wife of the Archbishop of Canterbury, was president from 1893 through 1895.

The GFS was set up to be non-sectarian; however, it utilised the infrastructure of the Church of England with parish, deanery, and diocesan groups. Its central office was in London, as befits a national organisation. Originally it was open to unmarried girls fourteen and older, but by 1879 it began to admit girls as young as eight years old. The core values of the GFS aimed at high moral standards for its members; they attempted to supply "for every working girl of unblemished character a friend in a class above her own."

This insistence that the girls must be of unblemished character, which was usually interpreted as meaning virginity, was highly contentious, although it is unclear how far it was tested in practice. Certainly some girls were asked to return their membership cards when they were suspected of having engaged in immoral conduct, and one girl sued for libel after the GFS expelled her as a member on the grounds that she was suspected of having an affair with a married man. Some clergy were in favour of the rule whilst others argued it was against the Christian ideal of forgiveness. This contention was partly the reason why the GFS never became an official CofE organisation, and this, in turn, meant it remained entirely female-managed although hugely influential, particularly as a bridge between the official Sunday Schools and Mothers’ Unions.

There were two classes of membership: the working-class girls, known as members, and the ladies, called associates. As it mimicked the founders’ own relationships with their servants, so it naturally attracted the huge domestic servant class, girls who often led a tough and lonely existence as maids-of-all-work in households with only one or two staff. It was less popular with shopgirls, who saw themselves as a cut above, and Northern millgirls, who were, according to a GFS report, "undisciplined, impatient of reproof and entirely wanting in self-control".

Both members and associates paid annual subscription fees tailored for their class, half of which went to the local group and half to the central office. Associates provided "recreation rooms" often in parish facilities, although sometimes in their own homes, where working-class girls could meet with associates and each other, read, sew, sing, and enjoy simple refreshments. Later "houses of rest" were established for these purposes. The local groups were called "branches" and the whole organisation was conceived of as a large tree with the central office as the trunk, and the members as leaves.

The central office of the GFS established a wide range of departments: one for their shop and factory workers programmes, one for publications, one for their "houses of rest" and one to deal with affiliated societies. GFS services included a circulating library and an employment exchange. The GFS published various journals including Friendly Leaves, Friendly Work and The Associates Journal. Publicity was also provided by Charlotte Mary Yonge, who featured the GFS in such novels as her The Two Sides of the Shield (1885).

They also produced many plays and pageants, often celebrating women of achievement while promoting the GFS ideals. Typical of these is the event produced by the Chelmsford Branch celebrating the achievements of Essex women. This opens with the arrival of a young country girl at a London railway station. She is frightened and alone, having been stood up by the young man who arranged to meet her. Luckily, she is befriended by a GFS associate, who takes her to a cafe and inspires her by telling her of the many great Essex women who have brought fame to their county. Another typical production was by the pageant master Louis N Parker, "The Quest", first produced at the Albert Hall in 1925, in which a girl has to choose between the "tinselled" low way or the high way.

By 1878, the GFS had a presence in 19 dioceses in the United Kingdom and Gibraltar, as well as the first branches of the Girls' Friendly Society in America and Ireland. It had 10,678 members and 4,442 associates. As the GFS expanded so did their concerns and the scope of their work. New departments established in the late 1800s included one dealing with the special needs of sick and blind members, and one dealing with the safety of emigrating girls and women had been established. During the 1880s and 1890s, the GFS increased their offerings of training courses and workshops. Beginning in 1880, Queen Victoria bestowed her royal patronage on the Girls' Friendly Society and the queen herself acted as an associate and admitted servant girls at Balmoral to membership. In 1883 the GFS appointed Ellen Joyce as their GFS emigration correspondent. Joyce had been one of the GFS's seventy-five founding associates and she wanted to support emigration, but she was aware of the risks that girls would be exposed to. Girls were given "anchor crosses" to place on their luggage. Joyce would eventually lead the United British Women's Emigration Association in 1888, but her role in the GFS continued.

=== 1900s ===
Queen Alexandra succeeded Queen Victoria as patron of the society following the latter's death in 1901. In 1902, the Princess of Wales consented to be vice-patron of the GFS. On St David's Day in 1910 a great gathering of GFS was held in the Queen's Hall, when the Princess of Wales consented to receive purses and present certificates on behalf of the Lodges and Homes of Rest Fund. Later in the same year the Princess of Wales became queen and consented to become patron of GFS.

GFS was (and remains) a non-political organisation and was not a participant in the women's suffrage movement in the United Kingdom or elsewhere. The Anglican Church Missionary Society and the GFS often worked together on joint charities at this time. The GFS quickly spread across the Atlantic and around the Commonwealth. A number of Holiday Houses (retreat centers) as well as summer camp facilities were established in the United States, and many remain in operation.

Constance Adelaide Smith and Ellen Porter of the Girls Friendly Society lodge led a campaign to promote Mothering Sunday following a decline in its popularity. Smith was inspired by the work carried out in the US by Anna Jarvis. Jarvis fought for a national calendar date honoring the sacrifices mothers make for their children amidst a background of national holidays favoring male achievements.

=== 2000s ===
In 2003, the chief executive of GFS described teenage pregnancy, low income, housing, as well as low confidence and self esteem among teenage girls as serious issues. She described the work of GFS as including supported housing for homeless young women and teenage mothers. In 2006, the Duchess of Cornwall became the patron of GFS. Her work with GFS included visiting a housing project in Bromley. At the time, the work of GFS included providing services to girls and young women through 40 youth work branches and four community projects that worked with socially excluded women under the age of 25.

In 2016, the Small Charities Coalition matched the Unicef UK digital engagement team with GFS to review and develop GFS's digital strategy. Unicef UK consulted with key stakeholders within GFS and subsequently designed a digital strategy, which was presented to GFS staff. In 2019, a Girls Friendly Society group was launched in Leytonstone with the support of the Head of Waltham Forest Council. The group provides a safe, female-only space for play, socialising and activities. Planned activities include local trips out, creative sessions and skills building.

In 2020, GFS committed to a new strategy, which focuses their work on geographical locations where girls face the most disadvantage. They have developed a cluster model that focuses on areas where support is badly needed, such as South Manchester, North East London, Liverpool and Swansea. They described their mission as: "Our mission is to support and inspire girls and young women. We will create spaces where they feel safe and valued, so that they can build strong foundations that will prepare them for life’s challenges."

== Programme ==
The contemporary Girls Friendly Society programme is informed by issues facing girls and young women today.

The activities that take place in groups are all geared towards helping the girls achieve growth in six key areas that help build the foundations to face life’s challenges. These six areas combine to make, what they call, The GFS Girl. The hope that each girl will learn to:

1. Speak up about things that matter to her
2. Be proud of who she is
3. Feel that she can try again if she have a setback
4. Feel able to try new or unfamiliar things
5. Believe she can achieve her hopes and dreams
6. Enjoy friendships with all kinds of people

== Girls Friendly Society Worldwide ==
GFS Worldwide provides support for GFS programmes and projects around the world, seeking to transform unjust structures of society, particularly for women and children. GFS Worldwide is governed by a set of guidelines and each GFS country operates under its own constitution and rules.

=== Australia ===
GFS Australia began in 1879 as a local branch in Adelaide.. Their national council meets every three years.

=== Ireland ===
GFS spread to the Church of Ireland in 1877. There are currently 80 branches throughout Ireland, a wide spectrum of interest is covered in the badge syllabus, which includes a study of the natural world, the community and the church, handcrafts and skills, information technology, sports and outdoor pursuits, as well as participating in fund raising to demonstrate our will to help others, both locally and globally.

=== Korea ===
GFS spread to Korea in 1965 and has 15 branches in 3 diocese. Their work includes Women's education, parent education, nurturing juniors, sharing house and supporting illegal women laborers, and to collaborate with the work of Mothers' Union, women's group united, women priests, committee for building women's mission centre etc.

=== United States ===
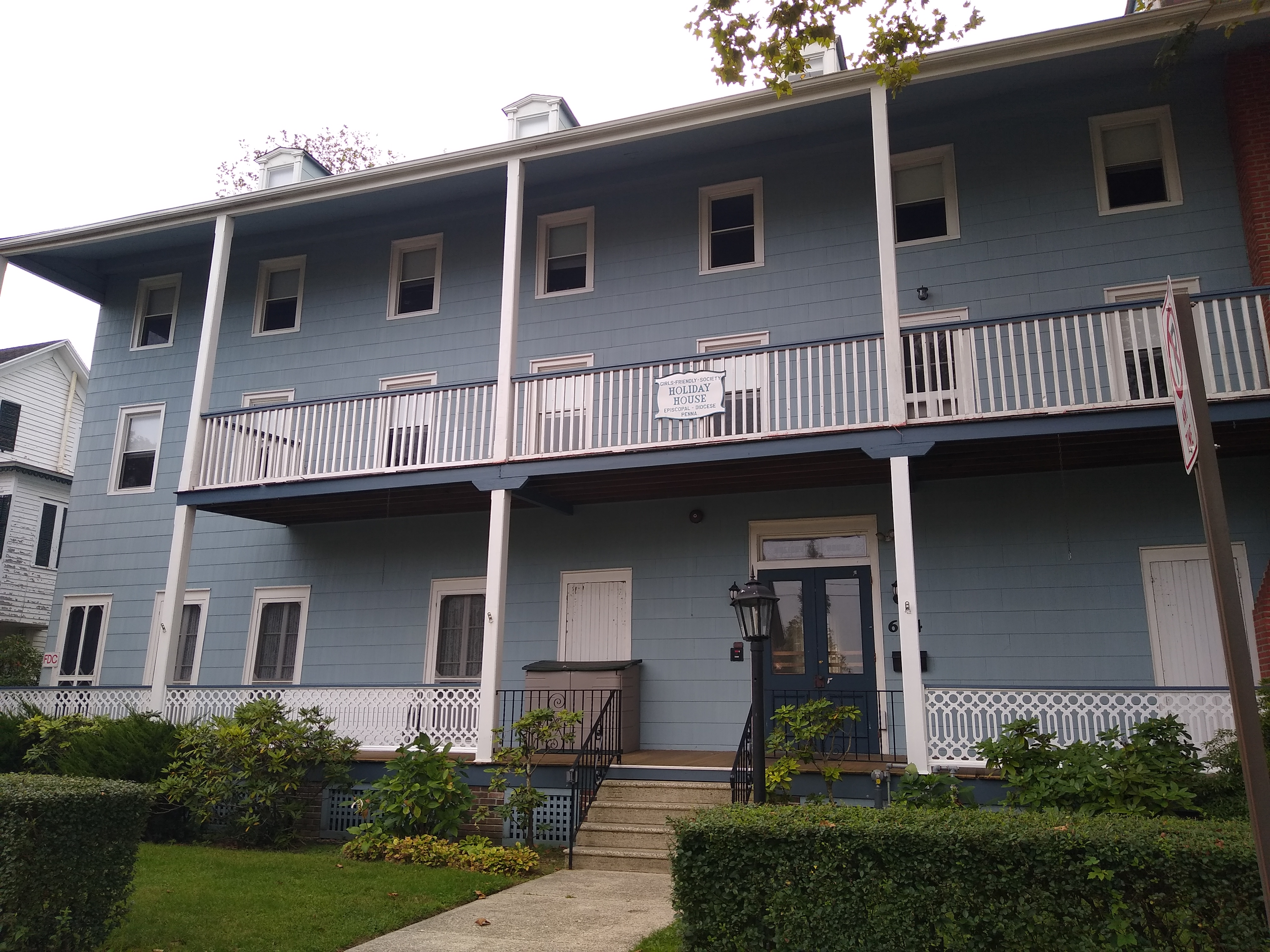
Girls Friendly Society Holiday House, Episcopal Diocese of Pennsylvania (Cape May, New Jersey)

The national board, GFS-USA, oversees local branches and is a member of GFS World. The program is open to girls ages 5+ with active chapters in:

- California
- Pennsylvania
- Connecticut
- New Jersey
- New York

=== Rest of the world ===
Other countries include United Kingdom, Cameroon, Canada, Ghana, Honduras, Japan, Kenya, Liberia, New Zealand, Papua New Guinea, The Philippines, Sierra Leone, South Africa, the Solomon Islands, Sri Lanka, Uganda and Zambia.
