= Operation Big Bang =

1947 destruction of bunkers on Heligoland

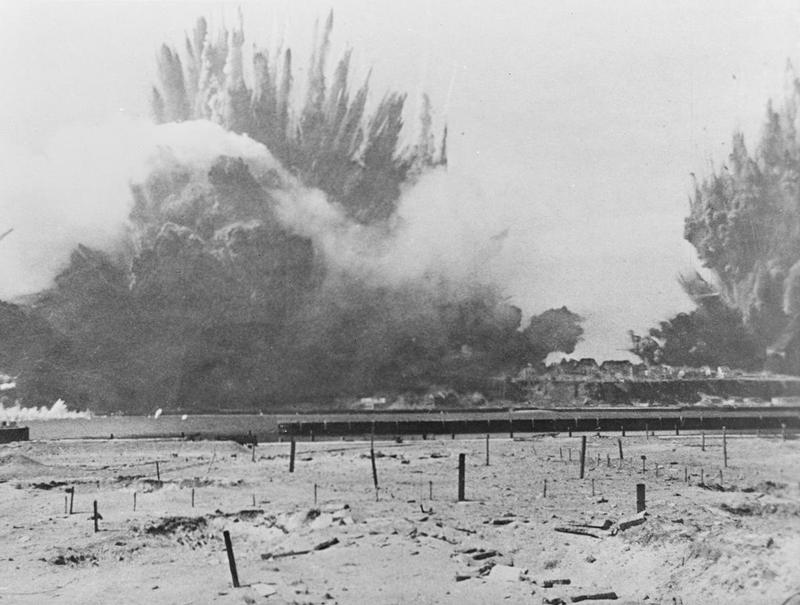
- Blasting of the bunkers of Heligoland, seen from the neighboring island Düne
- Date: 18 April 1947
- Time: 13:00 CET (12:00 UTC)
- Location: Heligoland, Germany; 54.1825°N 7.885278°E
- Also known as: Operation British Bang
- Cause: Detonation

Operation Big Bang or British Bang was the explosive destruction of bunkers and other military installations on the island of Heligoland. The explosion used 7400 tons (6700 metric tons) of surplus World War II ammunition, which was placed in various locations around the island and detonated at 1 p.m. on 18 April 1947 by the Royal Navy. The energy released was 13 terajoule, or about 3.2 kilotons of TNT equivalent making it the largest artificial non-nuclear explosion at that time. The objective of the blast was to destroy the bunkers and military installations on the North Sea island of Heligoland, but due to the enormous amount of explosives it was foreseen that the entire island might be destroyed. The porous sandstone that makes up the island allowed the blast wave to escape so only the southern tip of the island was destroyed, but there was considerable damage to the northern tip.

== Background ==
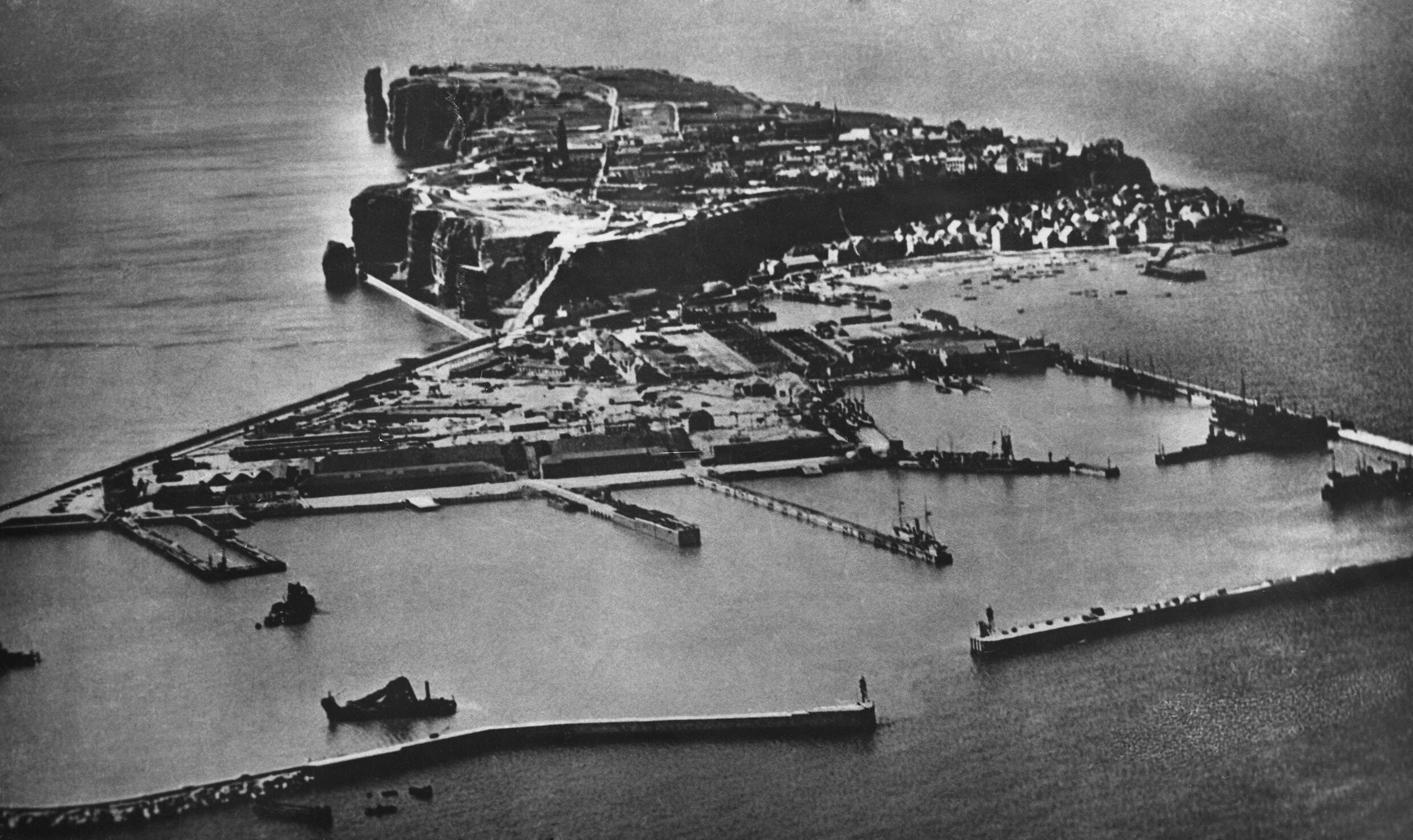
View of Heligoland before the destruction (circa 1920)

Because of its location in the centre of the German Bight, near the mouths of the Weser, the Elbe, and the Kiel Canal, the waters around the island of Heligoland were the scene of four naval battles in 1849, 1864, 1914, 1917 and one air battle in 1939. In 1807, the United Kingdom occupied the island, which had previously belonged to Denmark. In 1890, in the so-called Heligoland-Zanzibar Treaty, the German Empire exchanged German territorial claims in Africa for the island of Heligoland in order to develop it into a naval fortress and later a naval base. According to the provisions of the Treaty of Versailles, Article 115, the fortress was to be destroyed after the First World War. The work lasted from 1920 to 1922, but was not as thorough as originally envisaged; the basic structure was preserved. During the Nazi period (1938), the never-completed "Project Lobster Claw" (Projekt Hummerschere) was started to make the island a military counterweight to the British naval base in Scapa Flow. After the end of World War II, the island was in the British occupation zone in Germany and served as a blasting and training ground between 1945 and 1952.

== Explosion ==
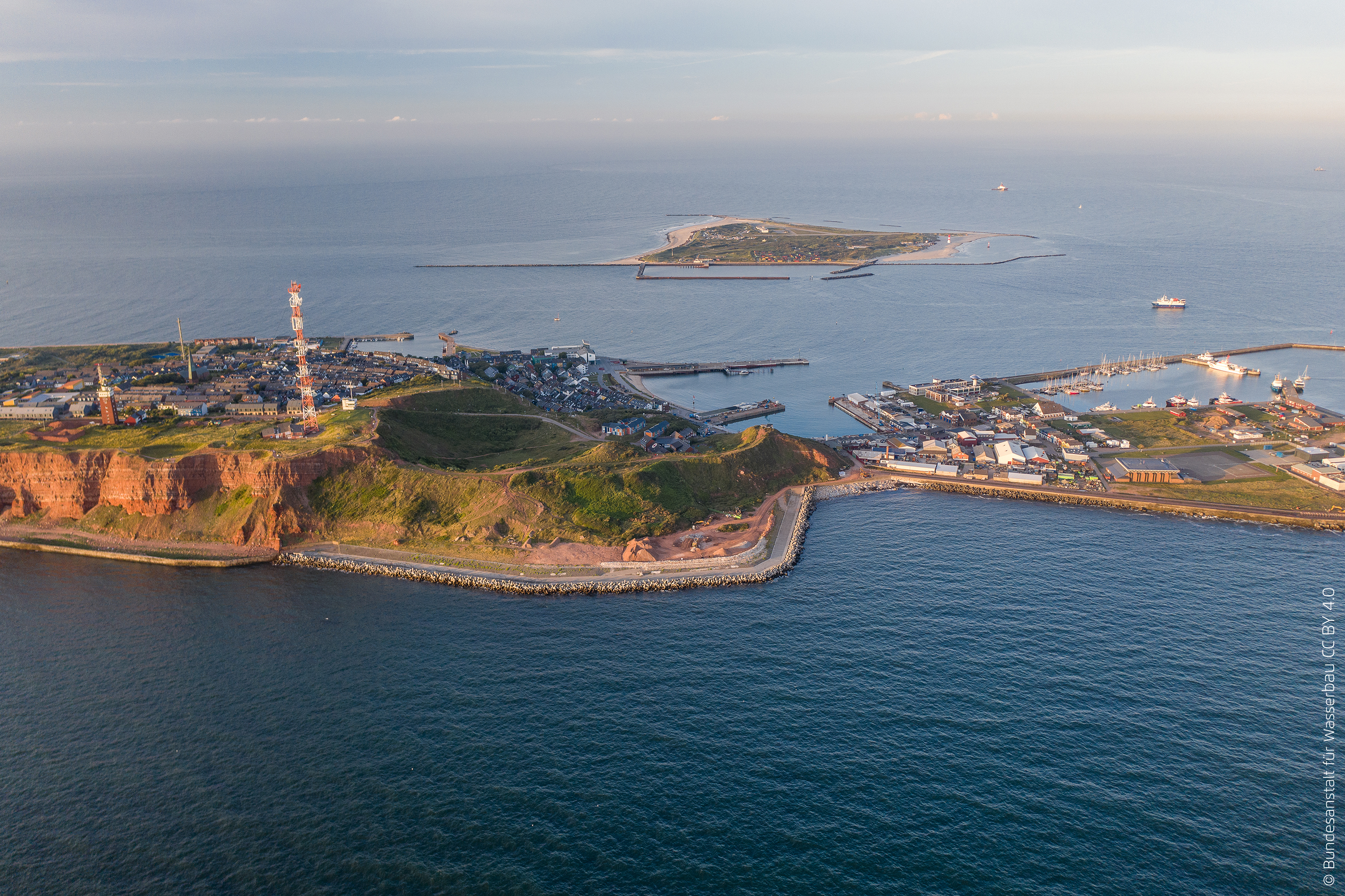
Huge blast crater on the south side of Heligoland, called Kringel (2020)

In April 1945, after a Royal Air Force bombing raid on Heligoland with about 1,000 bombers occurred on 18 April, the approximately 2,500 inhabitants were evacuated by the Wehrmacht garrison. On 11 May 1945 the island was occupied by British forces. In order to deny the uninhabited islands to the Germans as a potential naval base, the British began preparations to blow up the bunkers and military installations on Heligoland in 1947. They filled the Nordsee III submarine bunker in the southern harbour and the tunnel labyrinths with leftover munitions from the world wars. Since the preparations took longer than planned, the original deadline of 31 March could not be met.

On 18 April 1947, exactly two years after the bombing raid, the Royal Navy detonated the bomb. Stacked were about 4,000 torpedo heads, nearly 9,000 depth charges and over 91,000 shells of various calibres. The blast was set off by British engineers aboard HMS Lasso from a distance of about 17 kilometres. The British staged this blast for the German public; there was a separate brochure about it. Almost 20 journalists watched directly from the steamer Danzig. A smaller explosion was used to scare away the birds. The main explosion occurred a few minutes later. A huge jet of fire and tons of rock shot into the sky. The tremors could be felt in Cuxhaven, 70 kilometres away. The mushroom cloud rose about nine kilometres (according to other sources, one kilometre) into the air. The explosion shook the island base to a depth of several kilometres.

== Results ==
The island survived the blast, but the southern tip of the island, the rubble of which makes up today's Mittelland, was blown away. Parts of the cliff also collapsed, and many craters were created. The harbour facilities and coastal protection walls remained intact, and the surviving civil air raid shelters today attract up to 10,000 tourists annually. The only building to survive the blast was the flak tower, today's Heligoland Lighthouse. The detonation could be registered seismographically in Germany and used to study the Earth's crust. In 1952, after protests by the residents, the people of Heligoland were allowed to repopulate the island. Today, on the anniversary of the demolition, a memorial service is held in the civil defence bunker.
