= Heligoland =

Archipelago in Schleswig-Holstein, Germany

Heligoland Helgoland
- Municipality
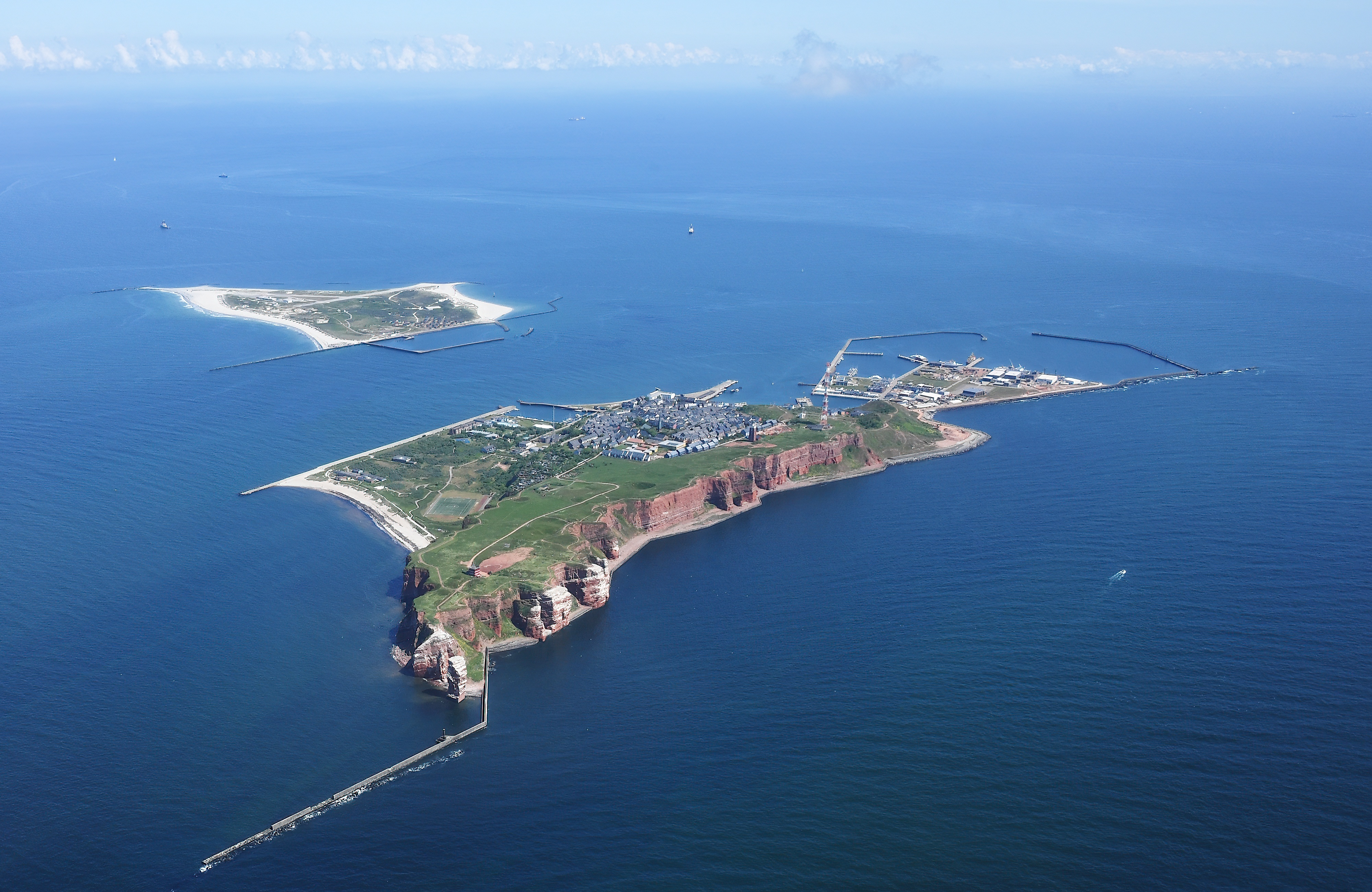

- Flag Coat of arms

- Location of Heligoland within Pinneberg district
- Interactive map of Heligoland
- Location within Germany Location within Schleswig-Holstein
- Coordinates: 54°10′57″N 7°53′07″E
- Country: Germany
- State: Schleswig-Holstein
- District: Pinneberg

Government
  - Mayor: Thorsten Pollmann (Ind.)

Area
  - Total: 4.21 km^{2} (1.63 sq mi)
- Elevation: 61 m (200 ft)

Population (2025-12-31)
  - Total: 1,297
  - Density: 308/km^{2} (798/sq mi)
- Time zone: UTC+01:00 (CET)
  - Summer (DST): UTC+02:00 (CEST)
- Postal codes: 27498
- Dialling codes: 04725
- Vehicle registration: PI, AG
- Website: www.helgoland.de/en official URL (English)

Heligoland (/ˈhɛlɪɡoʊlænd/; German: Helgoland, pronounced [ˈhɛlɡoˌlant]; Heligolandic Frisian: deät Lun, lit. 'the Land', Mooring Frisian: Hålilönj, Danish: Helgoland) is a small archipelago in the North Sea, administratively part of the German state of Schleswig-Holstein. The islands are located in the Heligoland Bight (part of the German Bight) in the southeastern corner of the North Sea and are the only German islands not in the vicinity of the mainland: they lie approximately 69 kilometres (37 1/2 nautical miles) by sea from Cuxhaven at the mouth of the River Elbe.

The islands were historically possessions of Denmark, then became possessions of the United Kingdom from 1807 to 1890. Since 1890, they have been part of Germany, although after World War II they along with the rest of Schleswig-Holstein were administered by the United Kingdom as part of the British occupation zone in Germany. British control of Heligoland lasted until 1952, when it was turned over to the control of West Germany.

Heligoland had a population of 1,127 at the end of 2016. In addition to German, the local population, who are ethnic Frisians, speak the Heligolandic dialect of the North Frisian language called Halunder. The islands are known for being the place where, in 1841, August Heinrich Hoffmann von Fallersleben wrote the lyrics to the "Deutschlandlied", which became the national anthem of Germany.

== Name ==
The island had no distinct name before the 19th century. It was often referred to by variants of the High German Heiligland ('holy land') and once even as the island of the Holy Virgin Ursula. Theodor Siebs summarised the critical discussion of the name in the 19th century in 1909 with the thesis that, based on the Frisian self-designation of the Heligolanders as Halunder, the island name meant 'high land' (similar to Hallig). In the following discussion by Jürgen Spanuth, Wolfgang Laur again proposed the original name of Heiligland. The variant Helgoland, which has appeared since the 16th century, is said to have been created by scholars who Latinized a North Frisian form Helgeland, using it to refer to a legendary hero, Helgi. The discussion is complicated by a disagreement as to which of the listed names really refers to the island of Helgoland, and by a desire for the island still to be seen as holy today.

== Geography ==
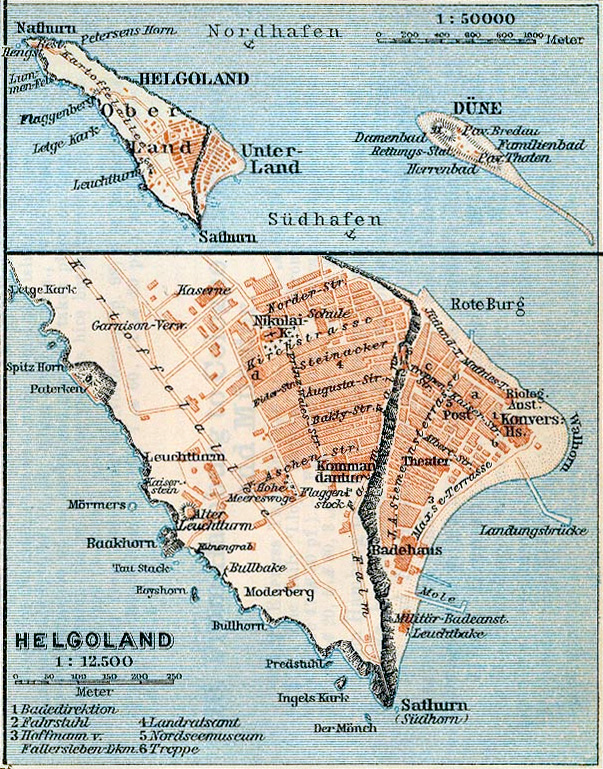
1910 map of Heligoland; the islands' coastlines have changed somewhat since this map was created.

Heligoland is located 46 kilometres (29 mi) off the German coastline and consists of two islands: the populated triangular one-square-kilometre (250-acre) main island (Hauptinsel) to the west, and the Düne ('dune', Heligolandic: de Halem) to the east. Heligoland generally refers to the former island. Düne is somewhat smaller at 0.7 km^{2} (170 acres), lower, and surrounded by sand beaches. It is not permanently inhabited, but is today the location of Heligoland's airfield.

The main island is commonly divided into the Unterland ('Lower Land', Heligolandic: deät Deelerlun) at sea level (to the right on the photograph, where the harbour is located), the Oberland ('Upper Land', Heligolandic: deät Boperlun) consisting of the plateau visible in the photographs, and the Mittelland ('Middle Land') between them on one side of the island. The Mittelland came into being in 1947 as a result of explosions detonated by the British Royal Navy (the so-called "Big Bang"; see below).

The main island also features small beaches in the north and the south and drops to the sea 50 metres (160 ft) high in the north, west and southwest. In the latter, the ground continues to drop underwater to a depth of 56 metres (184 ft) below sea level. Heligoland's most famous landmark is the Lange Anna ('Long Anna' or 'Tall Anna'), a free-standing rock column (or stack), 47 metres (154 ft) high, found northwest of the island proper.

The two islands were connected until 1720 when the natural connection was destroyed by a storm flood. The highest point is on the main island, reaching 61 metres (200 ft) above sea level.

Although culturally and geographically closer to North Frisia in the German district of Nordfriesland, the two islands are part of the district of Pinneberg in the state of Schleswig-Holstein. The main island has a good harbour and is frequented mostly by sailing yachts.

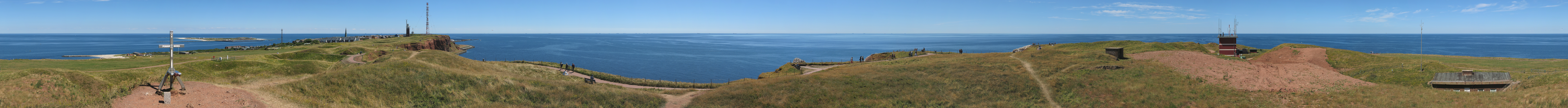
Panoramic view over Heligoland from the highest point

== History ==
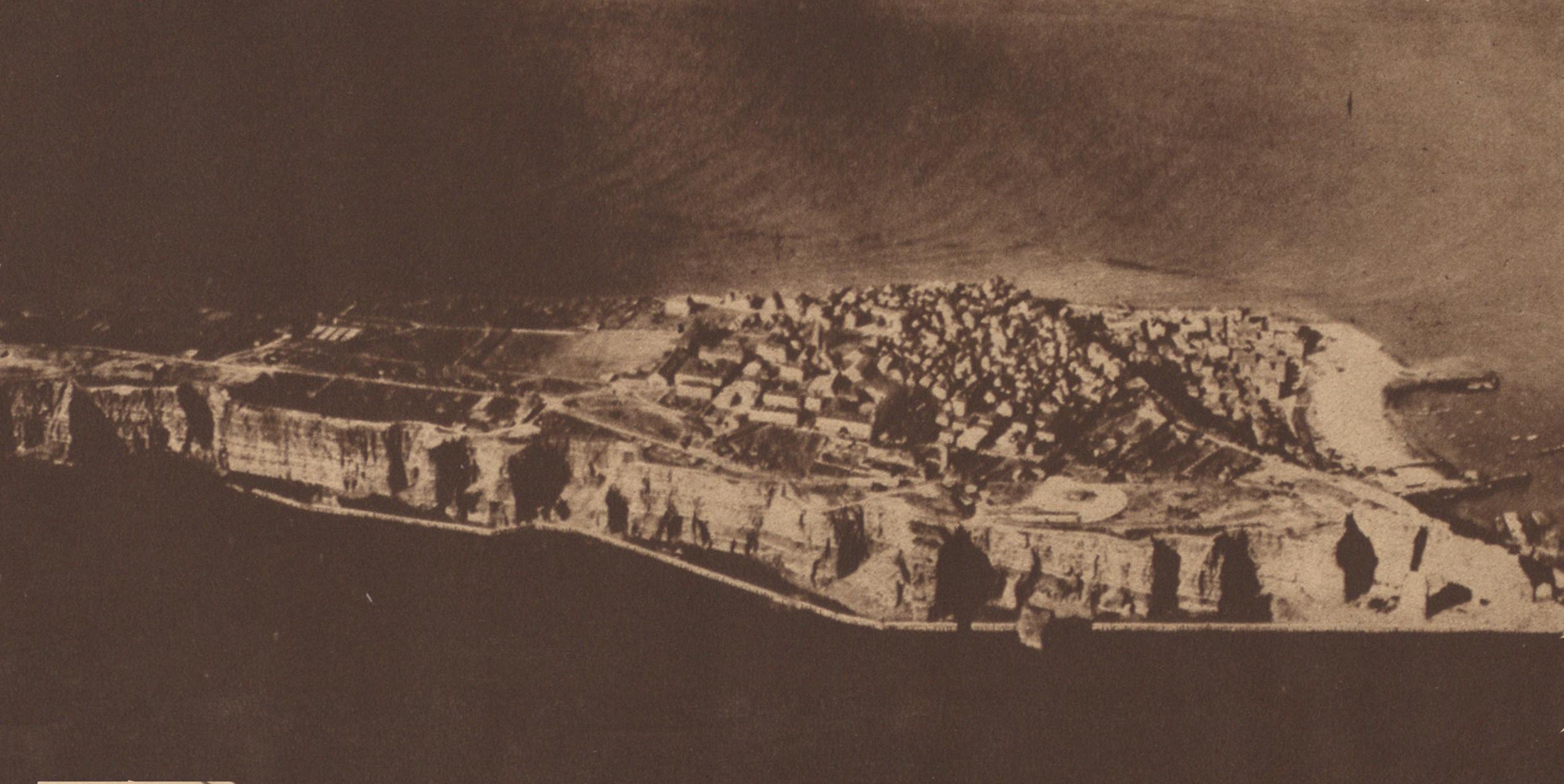
Aerial photograph showing new fortifications in 1919

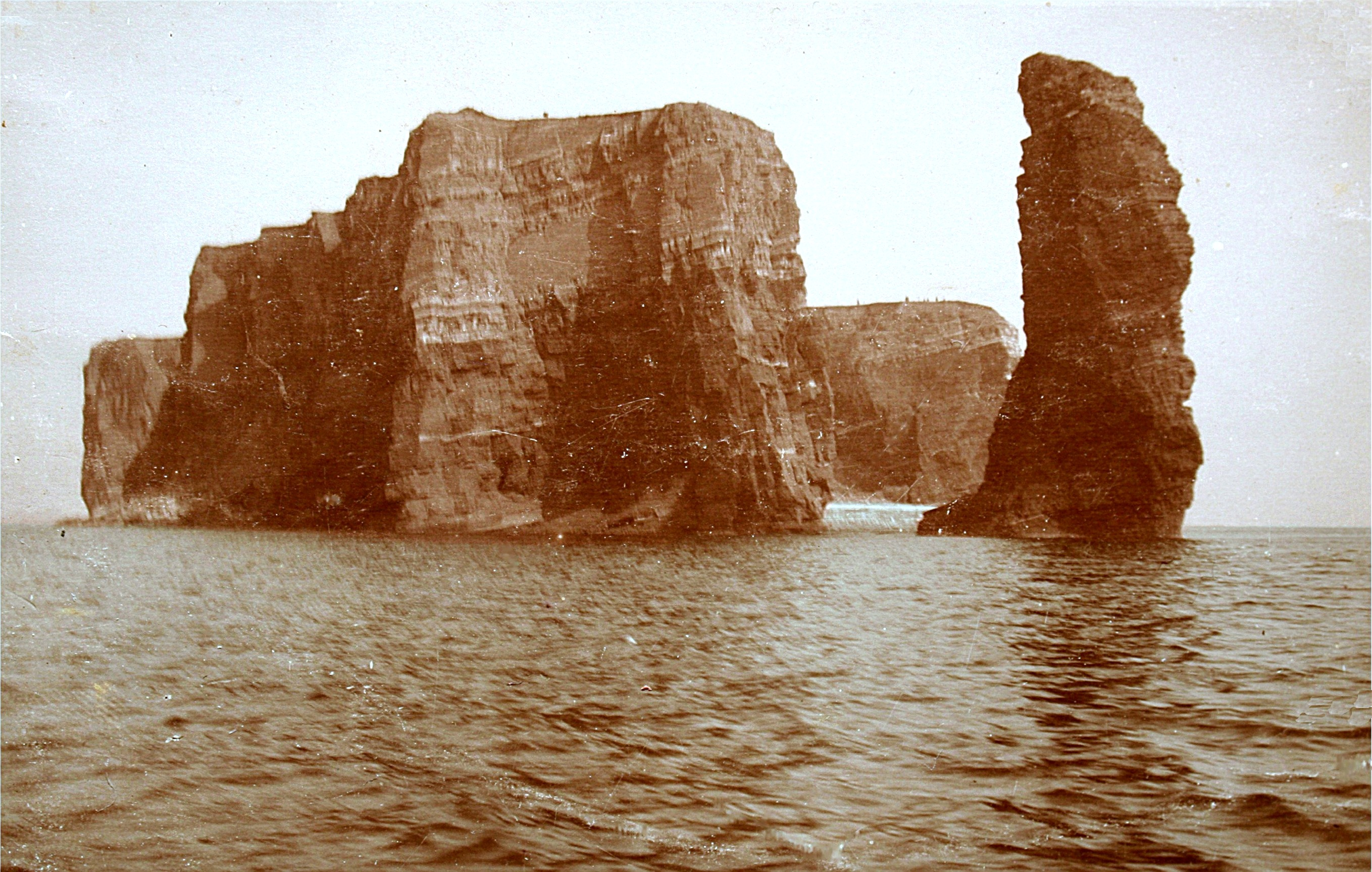
Heligoland about 1929–1930

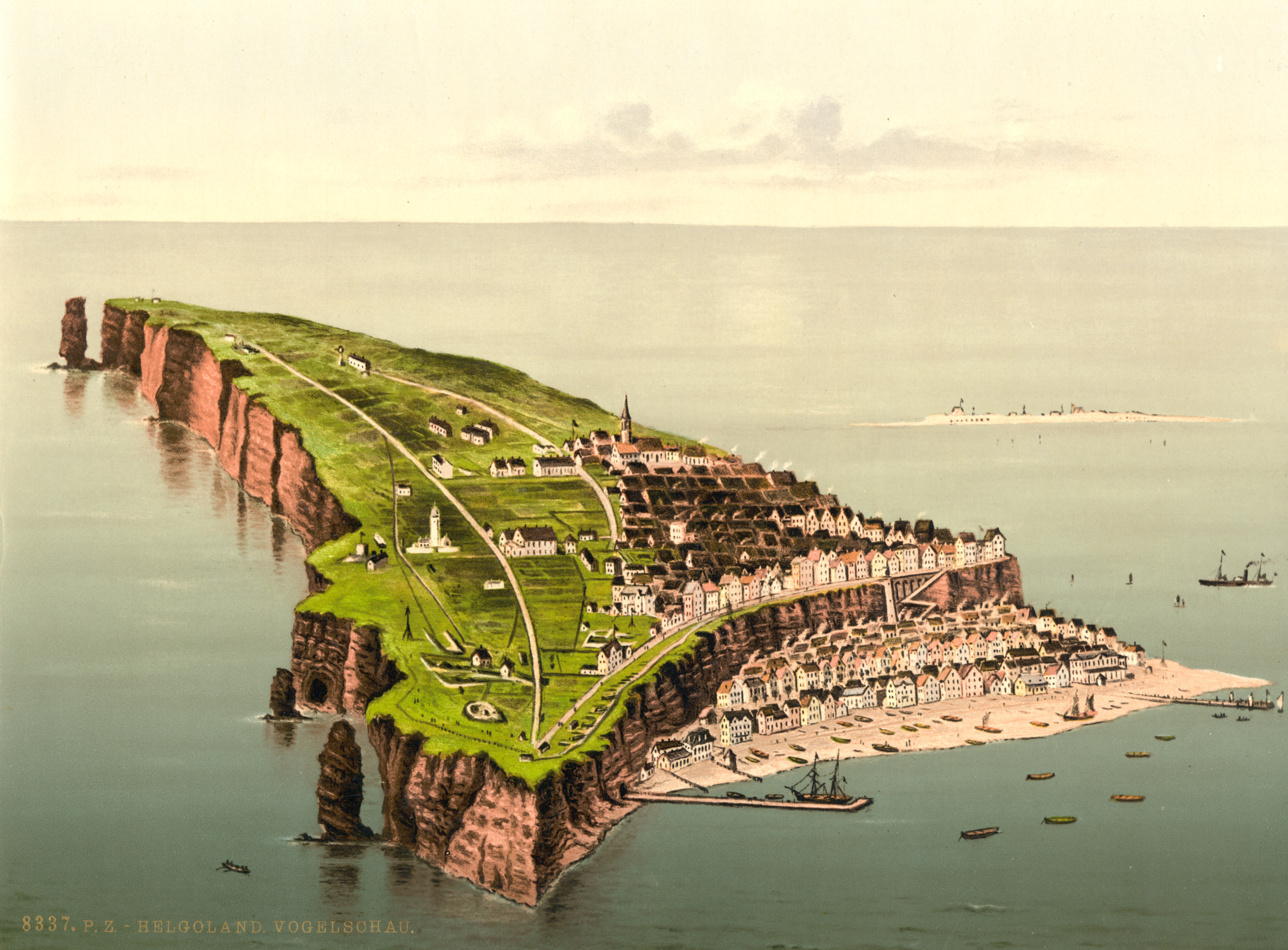
Bird's eye view, Heligoland, c. 1890–1900

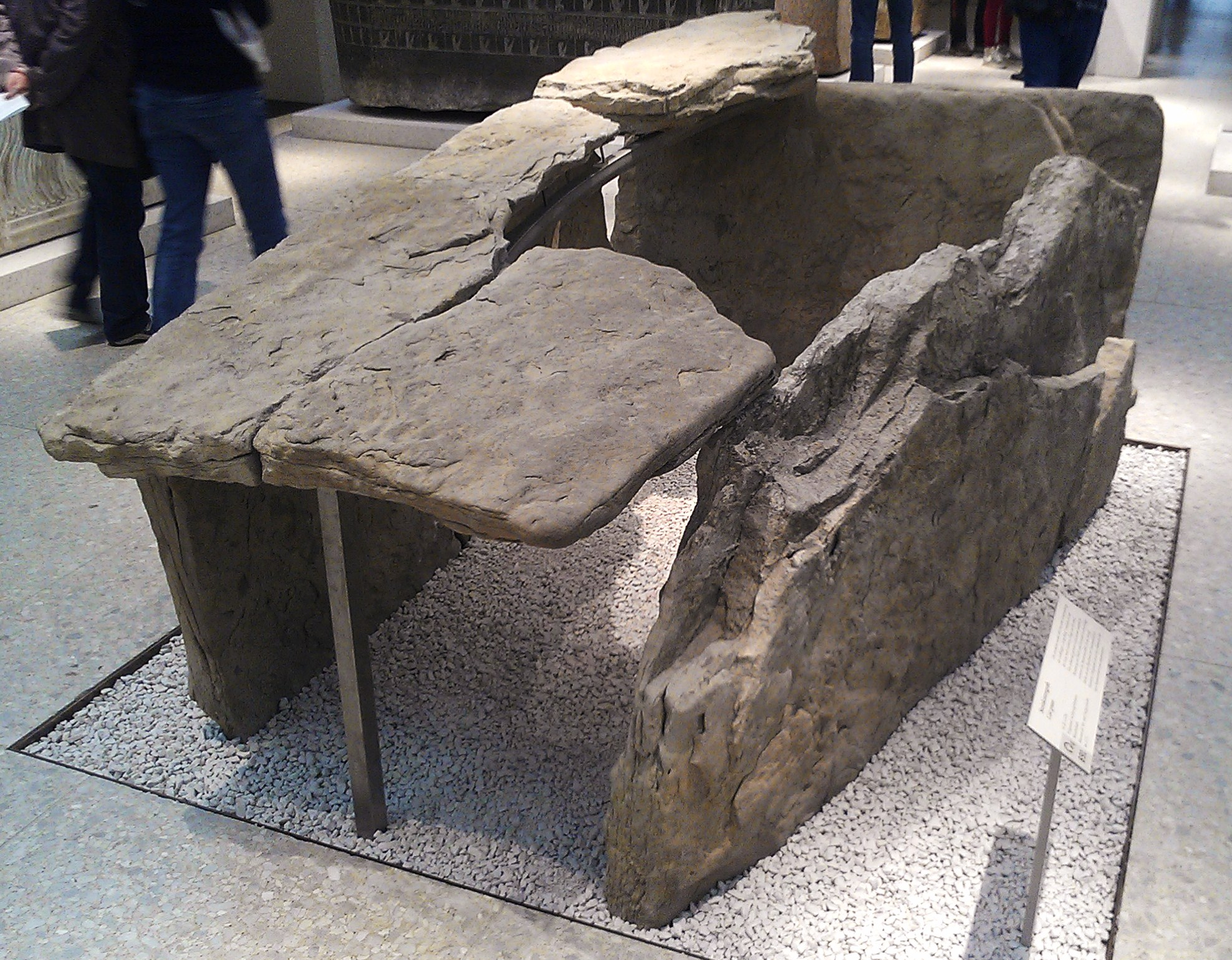
Prehistoric cist grave from Heligoland, now in Berlin's Neues Museum

The German Bight and the area around the island are known to have been inhabited since prehistoric times. Flint tools have been recovered from the bottom of the sea surrounding Heligoland. On the Oberland, prehistoric burial mounds were visible until the late 19th century, and excavations showed skeletons and artefacts. Moreover, prehistoric copper plates have been found under water near the island; those plates were almost certainly made on the Oberland.

In 697, Radbod, the last Frisian king, retreated to the then-single island after his defeat by the Franks – or so it is written in the Life of Willebrord by Alcuin. By 1231, the island was listed as the property of the Danish king Valdemar II. Archaeological findings from the 12th to 14th centuries suggest that copper ore was processed on the island.

There is a general understanding that the name "Heligoland" means "Holy Land" (compare modern Dutch and German heilig, "holy"). In the course of the centuries several alternative theories have been proposed to explain the name, from a Danish king Heligo to a Frisian word, hallig, meaning "salt marsh island". The 1911 Encyclopædia Britannica suggests Hallaglun, or Halligland, i.e. "land of banks, which cover and uncover".

Traditional economic activities included fishing, hunting birds and seals, wrecking and – very important for many overseas powers – piloting overseas ships into the harbours of Hanseatic League cities such as Bremen and Hamburg. In some periods Heligoland was an excellent base point for huge herring catches. Until 1714 ownership switched several times between Denmark–Norway and the Duchy of Schleswig, with one period of control by Hamburg. In August 1714, it was conquered by Denmark–Norway, and it remained Danish until 1807.

=== 19th century ===
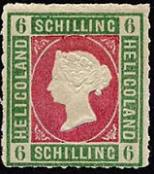
Postage stamp showing Queen Victoria and denominated in Hamburg schillings. From 1875 its postage stamps were denominated in both sterling and gold marks.

On 11 September 1807, during the Napoleonic Wars, HMS Carrier brought to the Admiralty the despatches from Admiral Thomas Macnamara Russell announcing Heligoland's capitulation to the British. Heligoland became a centre of resistance and intrigue against Napoleon. Denmark then ceded Heligoland to George III of the United Kingdom by the Treaty of Kiel (14 January 1814). Thousands of Germans came to Britain and joined the King's German Legion via Heligoland.

The British annexation of Heligoland was ratified by the Treaty of Paris signed on 30 May 1814, as part of a number of territorial reallocations following the abdication of Napoleon as Emperor of the French.

The prime reason at the time for Britain's retention of a small and seemingly worthless acquisition was to restrict any future French naval aggression against the Scandinavian or German states. In the event, no effort was made during the period of British administration to make use of the islands for military purposes, partly for financial reasons but principally because the Royal Navy considered Heligoland to be too exposed as a forward base.

In 1826, Heligoland became a seaside spa and soon turned into a popular tourist resort for the European upper class. The island attracted artists and writers, especially from Germany and Austria who apparently enjoyed the comparatively liberal atmosphere, including Heinrich Heine and August Heinrich Hoffmann von Fallersleben. More vitally it was a refuge for revolutionaries of the 1830s and the 1848 German revolution.

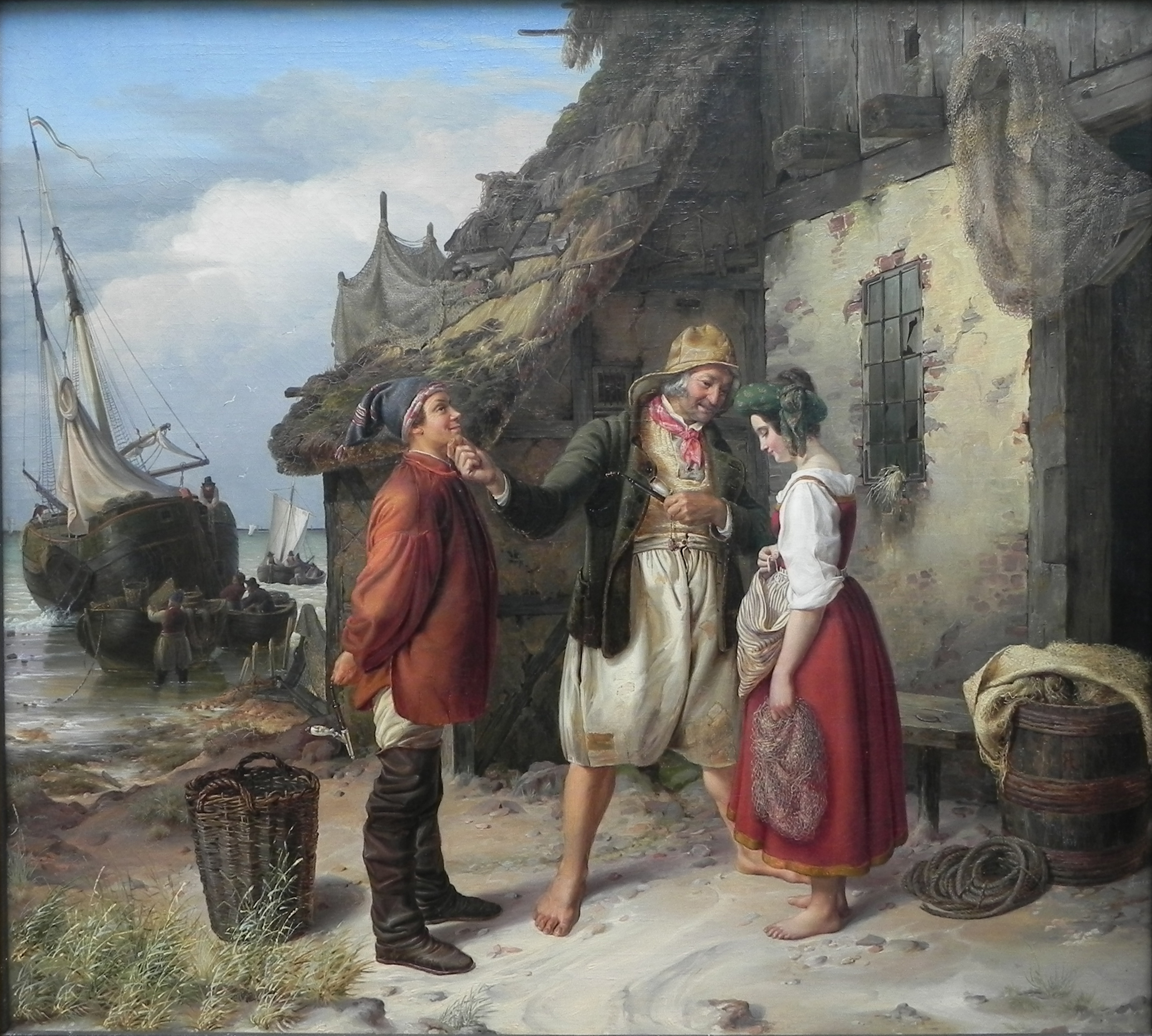
Marriage Proposal in Heligoland by Rudolf Jordan, 1834

As related in The Leisure Hour, it was "a land where there are no bankers, no lawyers, and no crime; where all gratuities are strictly forbidden, the landladies are all honest and the boatmen take no tips", while The English Illustrated Magazine provided a description in the most glowing terms: "No one should go there who cannot be content with the charms of brilliant light, of ever-changing atmospheric effects, of a land free from the countless discomforts of a large and busy population, and of an air that tastes like draughts of life itself."

Britain ceded the islands to Germany in 1890 in the Heligoland–Zanzibar Treaty. The newly unified Germany was concerned about a foreign power controlling land from which it could command the western entrance to the militarily-important Kiel Canal, then under construction along with other naval installations in the area and thus traded for it. A "grandfathering"/optant approach prevented the inhabitants of the islands from forfeiting advantages because of this imposed change of status.

Heligoland has an important place in the history of the study of ornithology, and especially the understanding of bird migration. The book Heligoland, an Ornithological Observatory by Heinrich Gätke, published in German in 1890 and in English in 1895, described an astonishing array of migrant birds on the island and was a major influence on future studies of bird migration.

In 1892, the Biological Station of Helgoland was founded by phycologist Paul Kuckuck, a student of Johannes Reinke (leading marine phycologist).

=== 20th century ===
Under the German Empire, the islands became a major naval base, and during the First World War the civilian population was evacuated to the mainland. The island was fortified with concrete gun emplacements along its cliffs similar to the Rock of Gibraltar. Island defences included 364 mounted guns including 142 42-centimetre (17 in) disappearing guns overlooking shipping channels defended with ten rows of naval mines. The first naval engagement of the war, the Battle of Heligoland Bight, was fought nearby in the first month of the war. The islanders returned in 1918, but during the Nazi era the naval base was reactivated.

Werner Heisenberg (1901–1976) first formulated the equation underlying his theory of quantum mechanics while on Heligoland in the 1920s. While a student of Arnold Sommerfeld at Munich, Heisenberg first met the Danish physicist Niels Bohr in 1922 at the Bohr Festival, Göttingen. He and Bohr went for long hikes in the mountains and discussed the failure of existing theories to account for the new experimental results on the quantum structure of matter. Following these discussions, Heisenberg plunged into several months of intensive theoretical research but met with continual frustration. Finally, suffering from a severe attack of hay fever that his aspirin and cocaine treatment was failing to alleviate, he retreated to the treeless (and pollenless) island of Heligoland in the summer of 1925. There he conceived the basis of the quantum theory.

In 1937, construction began on a major reclamation project (Project Hummerschere) intended to expand existing naval facilities and restore the island to its pre-1629 dimensions, restoring large areas which had been eroded by the sea. The project was largely abandoned after the start of World War II and was never completed.

==== World War II ====
The area was the setting of the aerial Battle of the Heligoland Bight in 1939, a result of Royal Air Force bombing raids on Kriegsmarine warships in the area. The waters surrounding the island were frequently mined by Allied aircraft.

Heligoland also had a military function as a sea fortress in the Second World War. Completed and ready for use were the submarine bunker North Sea III, coastal artillery, an air-raid shelter system with extensive bunker tunnels, and an airfield used by air force – Jagdstaffel Helgoland (April to October 1943). Forced labour of, among others, citizens of the Soviet Union were used in the construction of these military installations.

On 3 December 1939, Heligoland was directly bombed by the Allies for the first time. The attack, by twenty four Wellington bombers of 38, 115, and 149 squadrons of the Royal Air Force, failed to destroy the German warships at anchor.

In three days in 1940, the Royal Navy lost three submarines near Heligoland: HMS Undine on 6 January, Seahorse on 7 January and Starfish on 9 January.

Early in the war, the island was generally unaffected by bombing raids. Through the development of the Luftwaffe, the island had largely lost its strategic importance. The Jagdstaffel Helgoland, temporarily used for defence against Allied bombing raids, was equipped with a rare variant of the Messerschmitt Bf 109 fighter originally designed for use on aircraft carriers.

Not long before the war ended in 1945, Georg Braun and Erich Friedrichs succeeded in forming an anti-Nazi resistance group on the island. Shortly before they were to execute their plans, however, they were betrayed by two members of the group. About twenty men were arrested on 18 April 1945; fourteen of them were transported to Cuxhaven. After a short trial, five resisters were executed by firing squad at Cuxhaven-Sahlenburg on 21 April 1945 by the German authorities.

To honour them, in April 2010 the Helgoland Museum installed six stumbling blocks on the roads of Heligoland. Their names are Erich P. J. Friedrichs, Georg E. Braun, Karl Fnouka, Kurt A. Pester, Martin O. Wachtel, and Heinrich Prüß.

With two waves of bombing raids on 18 and 19 April 1945, 1,000 Allied aircraft dropped about 7,000 bombs on the islands. The populace hid in air raid shelters. The German military suffered heavy casualties during the raids. The bomb attacks rendered the island unsafe, and it was totally evacuated.

Bombing and mining of Heligoland during World War II
Date/Target	Result
3 December 1939	38, 115, and 149 squadrons of the Royal Air Force failed to destroy the German warships at anchor.
11 March – 24 August 1944	No. 466 Squadron RAAF laid mines.
18 April 1944	No. 466 Squadron RAAF conducted bombing operations.
29 August 1944	Mission 584: 11 B-17 Flying Fortresses and 34 B-24 Liberators bomb Heligoland Island; 3 B-24s are damaged. Escort is provided by 169 P-38 Lightnings and P-51 Mustangs; 7 P-51s are damaged.
3 September 1944	Operation Aphrodite B-17 63954 attempt on U-boat pens failed when US Navy controller flew aircraft into Düne Island by mistake.
11 September 1944	Operation Aphrodite B-17 30180 attempt on U-boat pens hit by enemy flak and crashed into sea.
29–30 September 1944	15 Lancasters conducted minelaying in the Kattegat and off Heligoland. No aircraft lost.
5–6 October 1944	10 Halifaxes conducted minelaying off Heligoland. No aircraft lost.
15 October 1944	Operation Aphrodite B-17 30039 *Liberty Belle* and B-17 37743 attempt on U-boat pens destroyed many of the buildings of the Unterland.
26–27 October 1944	10 Lancasters of No 1 Group conducted minelaying off Heligoland. 1 Lancaster minelayer lost. and the islands were evacuated the following night.
22–23 November 1944	17 Lancasters conducted minelaying off Heligoland and in the mouth of the River Elbe without loss.
23 November 1944	4 Mosquitoes conducted Ranger patrols in the Heligoland area. No aircraft lost.
31 December 1944	On Eighth Air Force Mission 772, 1 B-17 bombed Heligoland island.
4–5 February 1945	15 Lancasters and 12 Halifaxes minelaying off Heligoland and in the River Elbe. No minelaying aircraft lost.
16–17 March 1945	12 Halifaxes and 12 Lancasters minelaying in the Kattegat and off Heligoland. No aircraft lost.
18 April 1945	969 aircraft (617 Lancasters, 332 Halifaxes, 20 Mosquitoes) bombed the Naval base, airfield, and village into crater-pitted moonscapes. 3 Halifaxes were lost. The islands were evacuated the following day.
19 April 1945	36 Lancasters of 9 and 617 Squadrons attacked coastal battery positions with Tallboy bombs for no losses.

==== Explosion ====
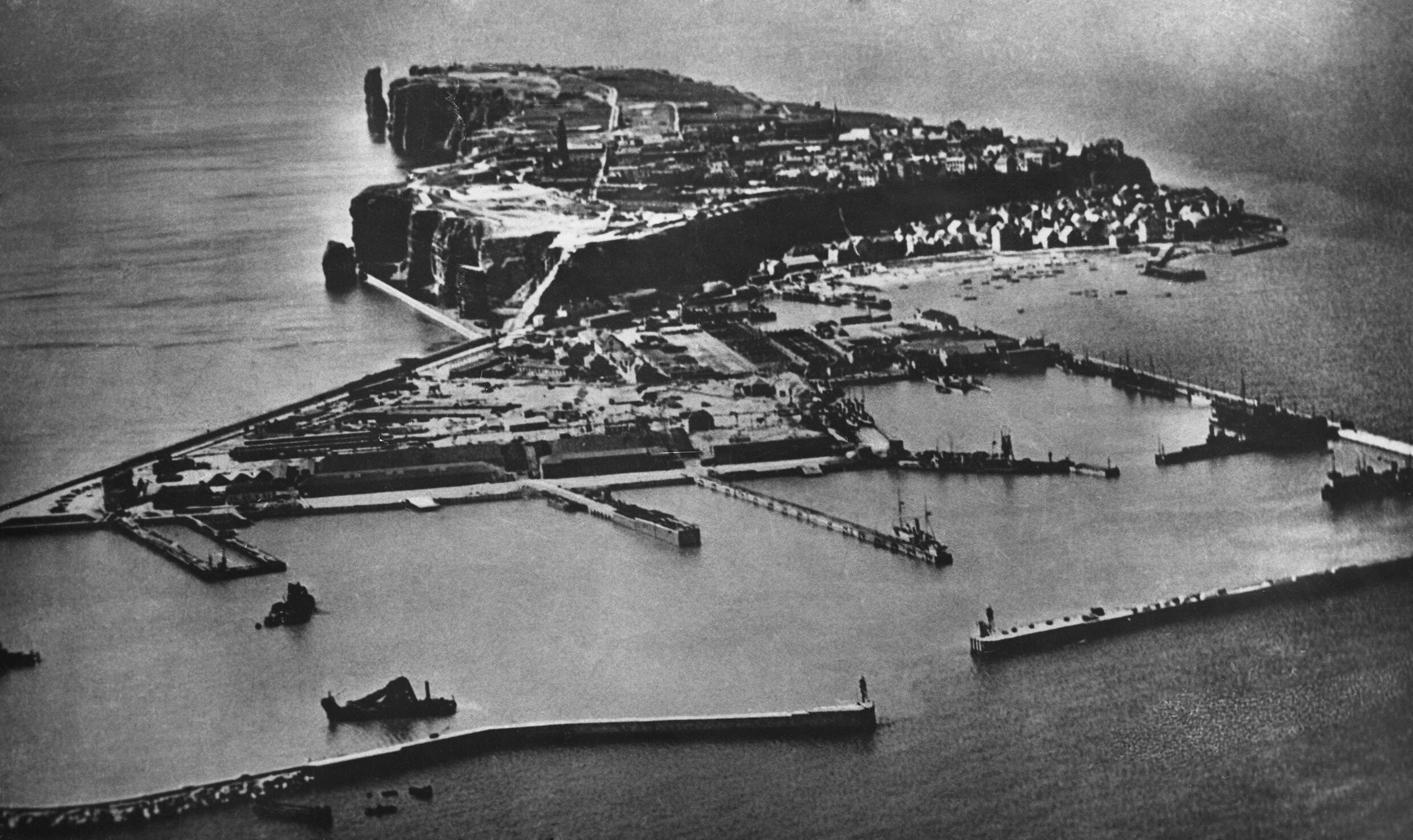
Aerial view of the naval base, taken from the south-west c. 1918...

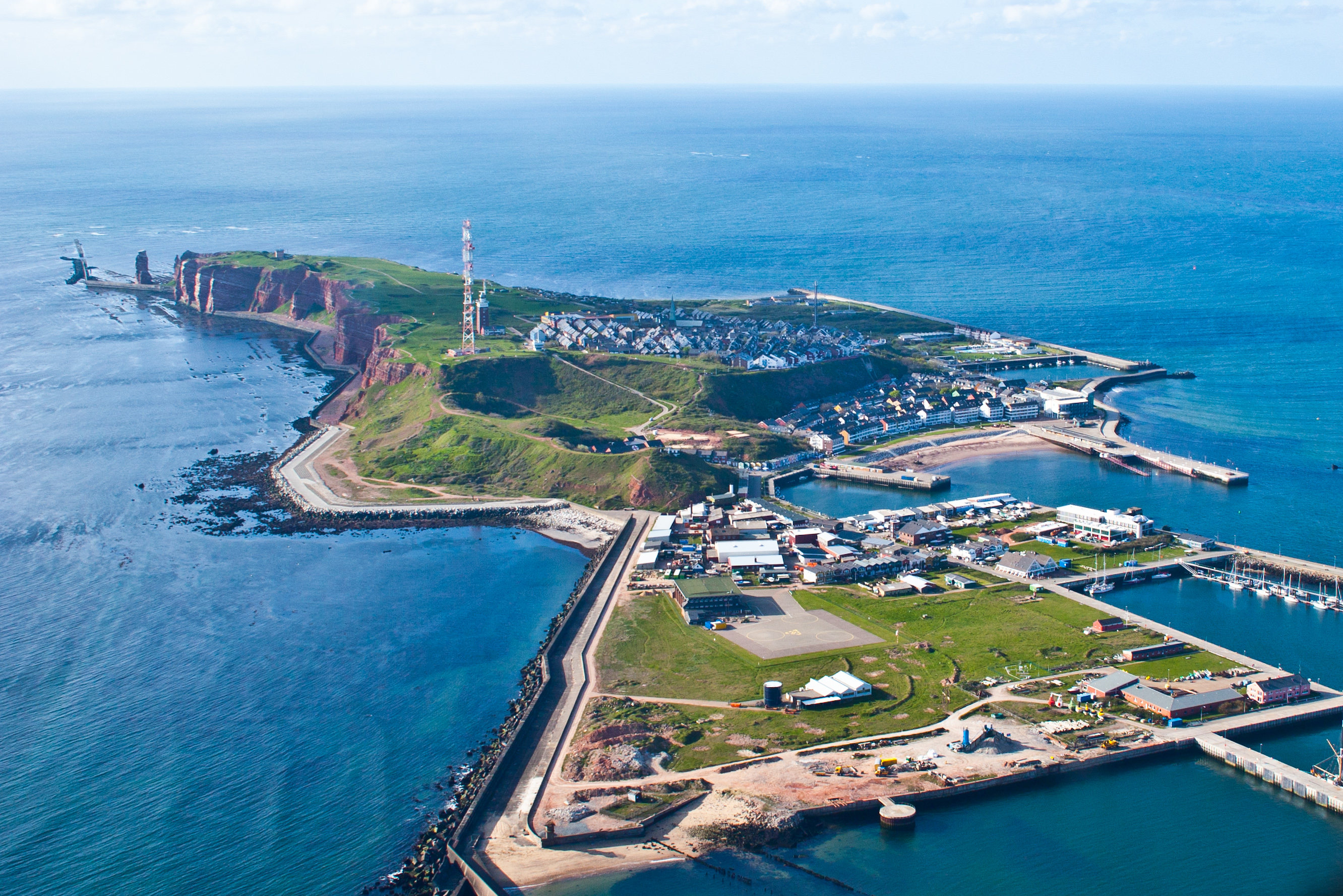
...and a similar view in 2012, showing a large crater at the south end of the island

From 1945 to 1952 the uninhabited islands fell within the British Occupation zone. On 18 April 1947, the Royal Navy simultaneously detonated 6,700 metric tons of explosives ("Operation Big Bang" or "British Bang"), successfully destroying the island's principal military installations — the submarine pens, the coastal batteries at the north and south ends of the island and 14 km (8 1/2 mi) of main storage tunnels — while leaving the town, already damaged by Allied bombing during the Second World War, "looking little worse". The destruction of the submarine pens created the Mittelland crater. The British later used the island, from which the population had been evacuated, as a bombing range. The explosion was one of the biggest single non-nuclear detonations in history.

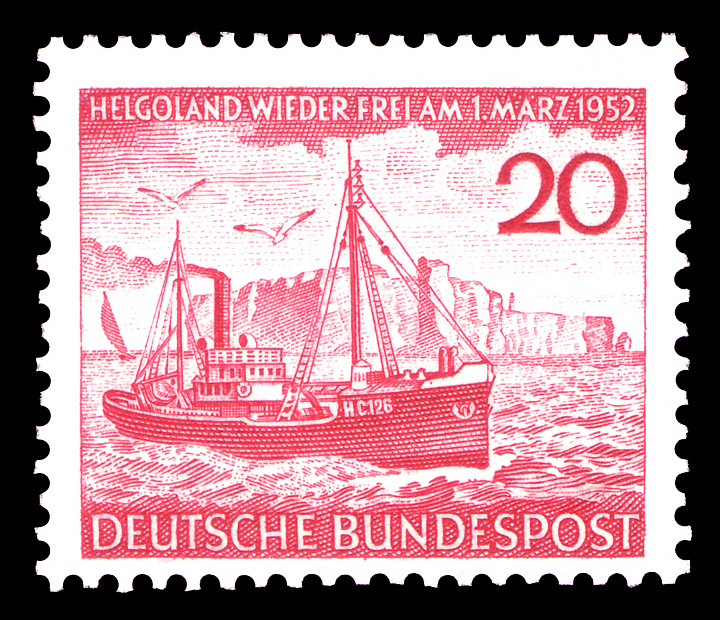
20 pfennig commemorative stamp issued by Deutsche Bundespost to commemorate the 1952 restoration of Helgoland

==== Return of sovereignty to Germany ====
On 20 December 1950, two students from Heidelberg—René Leudesdorff and Georg von Hatzfeld, accompanied by journalists—spent two days and a night on the island, planting in various combinations the flags of West Germany, the European Movement International and Heligoland. They returned with others on 27 December and on 29 December were joined by Heidelberg history professor and publicist Hubertus zu Löwenstein. The occupation was ended by British authorities, with cooperation of West German police, on 3 January 1951. The event started a movement to restore the islands to Germany, which gained the support of the West German parliament. On 1 March 1952, Heligoland was placed under West German control and the former inhabitants were allowed to return. The first of March is an official holiday on the island. The government of West Germany cleared a significant quantity of unexploded ordnance and rebuilt the houses before allowing its citizens to resettle there.

=== 21st century ===
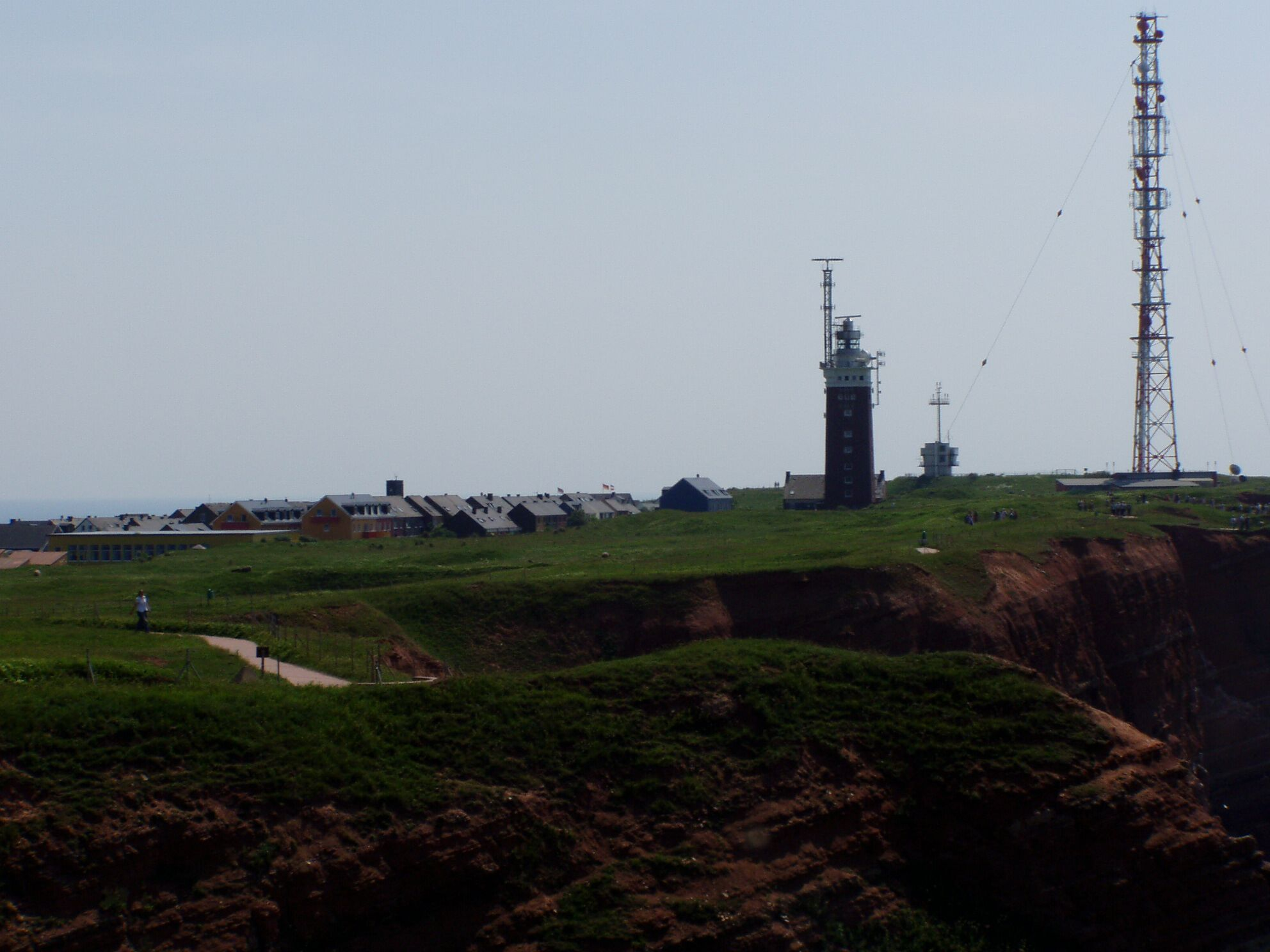
Heligoland Lighthouse, control station of the Bundeswehr and network tower

Heligoland, like the small exclave Büsingen am Hochrhein, is now a holiday resort and enjoys a tax-exempt status, being part of Germany and the EU but excluded from the EU VAT area and customs union. Consequently, much of the economy is founded on sales of cigarettes, alcoholic beverages, and perfume to tourists who visit the islands. The ornithological heritage of Heligoland has also been re-established, with the Heligoland Bird Observatory, now managed by the Ornithologische Arbeitsgemeinschaft Helgoland e.V. ("Ornithological Society of Heligoland") which was founded in 1991. This observatory gives its name to the Heligoland trap, a bird trapping structure used for bird ringing. A search and rescue (SAR) base of the DGzRS, the Deutsche Gesellschaft zur Rettung Schiffbrüchiger (German Maritime Search and Rescue Service), is located on Heligoland.

==== Energy supply ====
Before the island was connected to the mainland network by a submarine cable in 2009, electricity was generated by a diesel plant.

Heligoland was the site of a trial of GROWIAN, a large wind-turbine testing project. In 1990, a 1.2 MW turbine of the MAN type WKA 60 was installed. Besides technical problems, the turbine was not lightning-proof and insurance companies would not provide coverage. The wind energy project was viewed as a failure by the islanders and was stopped. The Heligoland Power Cable has a length of 53 kilometres (33 mi) and is one of the longest AC submarine power cables in the world and the longest of its kind in Germany. It was manufactured by the North German Seacable Works in a single piece and was laid by the barge Nostag 10 in 2009. The cable is designed for an operational voltage of 30 kV, and reaches the German mainland at Sankt Peter-Ording.

==== Expansion plans and wind industry ====
Plans to re-enlarge the land bridge between different parts of the island by means of land reclamation came up between 2008 and 2010. However, the locals voted against the project.

Since 2013, a new industrial site is being expanded on the southern harbour. E.ON, RWE and WindMW plan to manage operation and services of large offshore windparks from Heligoland. The range had been cleared of leftover ammunition.

== Demographics ==
At the beginning of 2020, 1,399 people lived on Heligoland. As of 2018, the population is mostly Lutheran (63%), and a minority (18%) is Catholic. There is a multi-sport club on the island, VfL Fosite Helgoland, with about 500 members.

== Climate ==
The climate of Heligoland is typical of an oceanic climate (Köppen: Cfb; Trewartha: Dolk), almost free of pollen and thus ideal for people with pollen allergies. Temperatures rarely drop below 0 °C (32 °F) even in the winter. At times, winter temperatures can be higher than in Hamburg by up to 10 °C (18 °F) because cold air from the east is warmed over the North Sea. While spring tends to be comparatively cool, autumn on Heligoland is often longer and warmer than on the mainland, and the climate is generally sunnier. On the 27th June 2026 the temperature climbed above the 30 °C (86 °F) mark for the first time since records begun.

Owing to the mild climate, figs have reportedly been grown on the island as early as 1911, and a 2005 article mentioned Japanese bananas, figs, agaves, palm trees and other exotic plants that had been planted on Heligoland and were thriving. There still is an old mulberry tree in the Upper Town.

The Heligoland weather station has recorded the following extreme values:

- Its highest temperature was 30.4 °C (86.7 °F) on 27 June 2026.
- Its lowest temperature was −11.2 °C (11.8 °F) on 15 February 1956.
- Its greatest annual precipitation was 1,069.0 mm (42.09 in) in 1998.
- Its least annual precipitation was 394.2 mm (15.52 in) in 1959.
- The longest annual sunshine was 2078 hours in 1959.
- The shortest annual sunshine was 1461.3 hours in 1985.

Climate data for Heligoland (1991–2020 normals, extremes 1952–present)
Month	Jan	Feb	Mar	Apr	May	Jun	Jul	Aug	Sep	Oct	Nov	Dec	Year
Record high °C (°F)	11.6 (52.9)	11.1 (52.0)	14.9 (58.8)	19.6 (67.3)	23.9 (75.0)	30.4 (86.7)	28.7 (83.7)	28.1 (82.6)	24.4 (75.9)	19.5 (67.1)	16.8 (62.2)	12.9 (55.2)	30.4 (86.7)
Mean maximum °C (°F)	8.6 (47.5)	7.7 (45.9)	9.8 (49.6)	14.9 (58.8)	18.9 (66.0)	22.5 (72.5)	24.2 (75.6)	24.2 (75.6)	20.6 (69.1)	17.1 (62.8)	13.4 (56.1)	10.3 (50.5)	25.4 (77.7)
Mean daily maximum °C (°F)	5.1 (41.2)	4.6 (40.3)	6.2 (43.2)	9.8 (49.6)	13.5 (56.3)	16.7 (62.1)	19.3 (66.7)	20.0 (68.0)	17.4 (63.3)	13.5 (56.3)	9.5 (49.1)	6.7 (44.1)	11.9 (53.4)
Daily mean °C (°F)	3.8 (38.8)	3.3 (37.9)	4.6 (40.3)	7.6 (45.7)	11.2 (52.2)	14.4 (57.9)	17.2 (63.0)	17.9 (64.2)	15.7 (60.3)	12.1 (53.8)	8.1 (46.6)	5.3 (41.5)	10.1 (50.2)
Mean daily minimum °C (°F)	2.2 (36.0)	1.9 (35.4)	3.1 (37.6)	5.8 (42.4)	9.3 (48.7)	12.6 (54.7)	15.3 (59.5)	16.1 (61.0)	14.0 (57.2)	10.5 (50.9)	6.6 (43.9)	3.7 (38.7)	8.4 (47.1)
Mean minimum °C (°F)	−3.2 (26.2)	−2.5 (27.5)	−0.4 (31.3)	2.3 (36.1)	5.9 (42.6)	9.6 (49.3)	12.5 (54.5)	12.6 (54.7)	10.7 (51.3)	6.1 (43.0)	1.7 (35.1)	−1.2 (29.8)	−4.5 (23.9)
Record low °C (°F)	−10.7 (12.7)	−11.2 (11.8)	−7.0 (19.4)	−2.1 (28.2)	1.6 (34.9)	5.0 (41.0)	7.2 (45.0)	9.0 (48.2)	5.7 (42.3)	1.5 (34.7)	−4.0 (24.8)	−8.0 (17.6)	−11.2 (11.8)
Average precipitation mm (inches)	62.6 (2.46)	44.9 (1.77)	41.8 (1.65)	35.7 (1.41)	40.3 (1.59)	56.0 (2.20)	67.8 (2.67)	88.8 (3.50)	88.2 (3.47)	84.7 (3.33)	76.1 (3.00)	73.9 (2.91)	760.8 (29.95)
Average extreme snow depth cm (inches)	1.6 (0.6)	1.4 (0.6)	0.9 (0.4)	0 (0)	0 (0)	0 (0)	0 (0)	0 (0)	0 (0)	0 (0)	trace	1.7 (0.7)	4.1 (1.6)
Average precipitation days (≥ 1.0 mm)	18.6	15.1	15.3	12.8	12.6	14.0	14.8	16.3	16.5	18.4	19.5	19.8	193.8
Average snowy days (≥ 1.0 cm)	1.5	2.0	1.1	0	0	0	0	0	0	0	0.1	1.2	5.9
Average relative humidity (%)	85.8	85.4	84.8	82.7	81.5	81.5	80.7	78.6	77.8	79.2	82.9	84.5	82.1
Mean monthly sunshine hours	49.0	73.5	137.6	204.4	250.8	240.4	247.5	225.0	156.4	104.9	51.3	37.4	1,778.4
Source 1: World Meteorological Organization
Source 2: Deutscher Wetterdienst / SKlima.de

== Geology ==
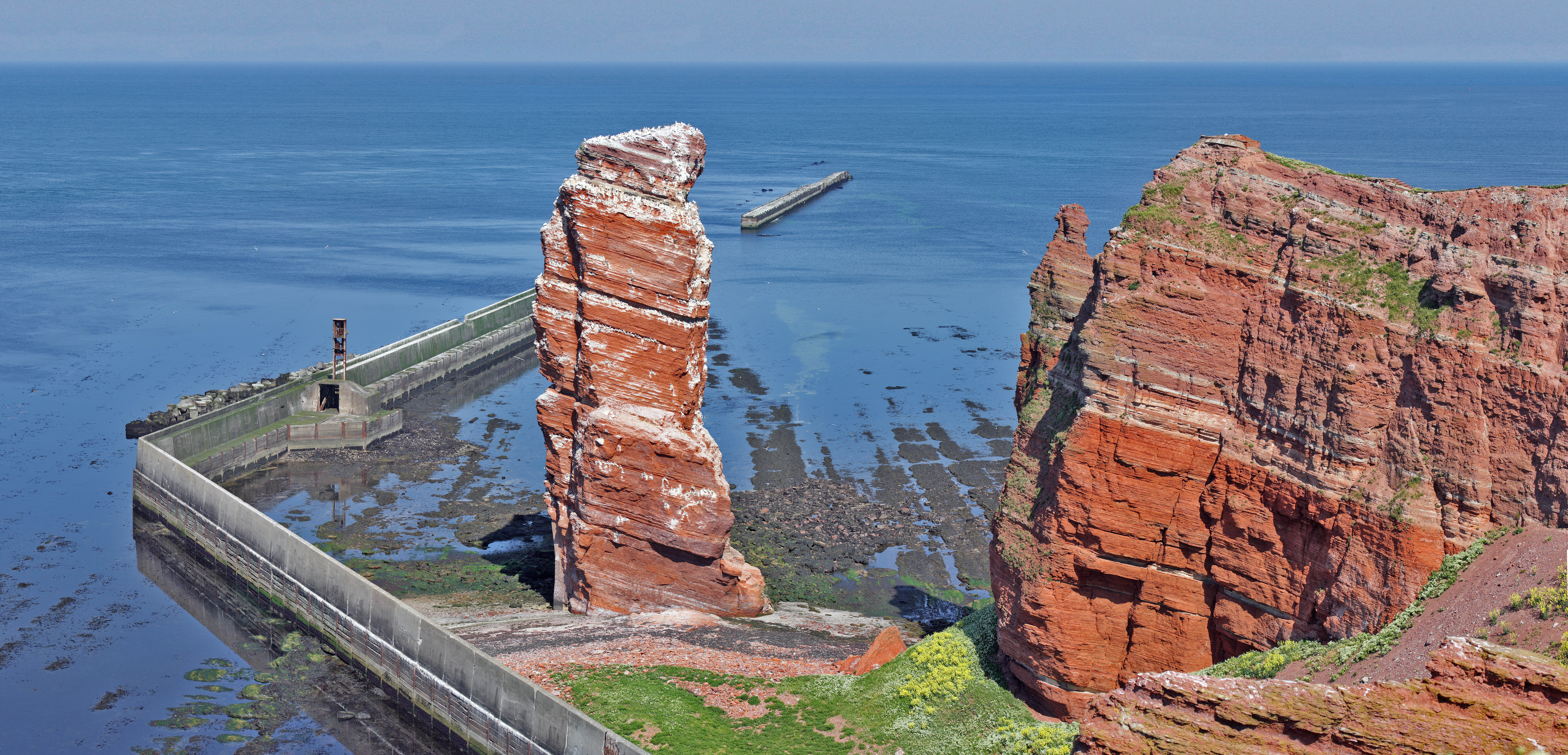
Lange Anna from the West

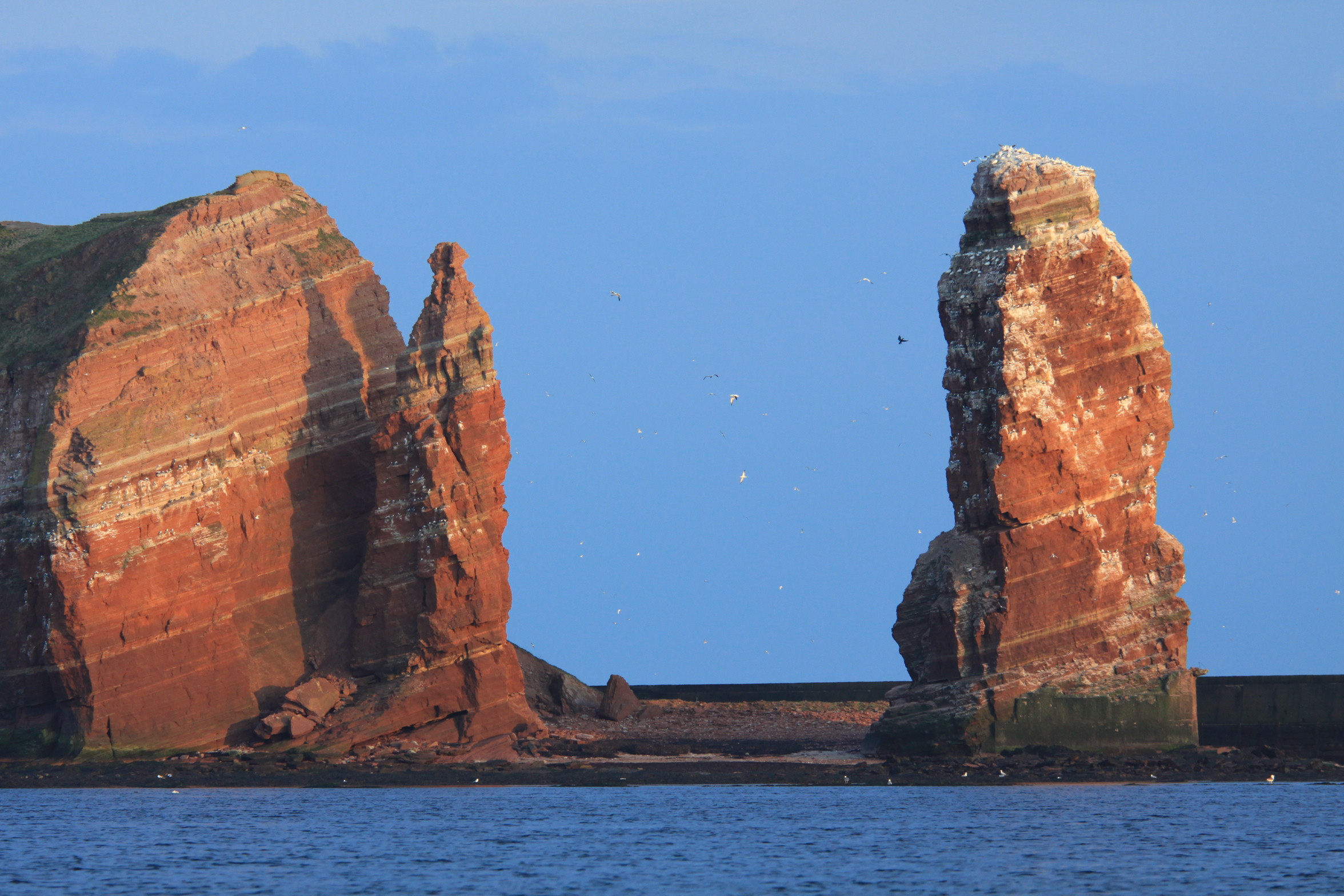
Lange Anna from the East

The island of Heligoland is a geological oddity; the presence of the main island's characteristic red sedimentary rock in the middle of the German Bight is unusual. It is the only such formation of cliffs along the continental coast of the North Sea. The formation itself, called the Bunter sandstone or Buntsandstein, is from the early Triassic geologic age. It is older than the white chalk that underlies the island Düne, the same rock that forms the White Cliffs of Dover in England and cliffs of Danish and German islands in the Baltic Sea. A small chalk rock close to Heligoland, called witt Kliff (white cliff), is known to have existed within sight of the island to the west until the early 18th century, when storm floods finally eroded it to below sea level.

Heligoland's rock is significantly harder than the postglacial sediments and sands forming the islands and coastlines to the east of the island. This is why the core of the island, which a thousand years ago was still surrounded by a large low-lying marshland and sand dunes separated from coast in the east only by narrow channels, has remained to this day, although the onset of the North Sea has long eroded away all of its surroundings. A small piece of Heligoland's sand dunes remains – the sand isle just across the harbour called Düne (Dune). A referendum in June 2011 dismissed a proposal to reconnect the main island to the Düne islet with a landfill.

West coast of Heligoland

== Flag ==
Flag of Heligoland

The Heligoland flag is very similar to its coat of arms – it is a tricolour flag with three horizontal bars, from top to bottom: green, red and white. Each of the colours has its symbolic meaning, as expressed in its motto:

German

Grün ist das Land,
rot ist die Kant,
weiß ist der Sand,
das sind die Farben von
Helgoland.

Low German

Gröön is dat Land,
rood is de Kant,
witt is de Sand,
dat sünd de Farven van't
Helgoland.

North Frisian

Grön es det Lunn,
road es de Kläwwkant,
witt es de Sunn,
det sen de Téken van't
Hillige Lunn.

English

Green is the land,
Red is the cliff,
White is the sand,
Those are the colours of
Heligoland.

There is an alternative version in which the word Sand ("sand") is replaced with Strand ("beach").

== Road restrictions ==
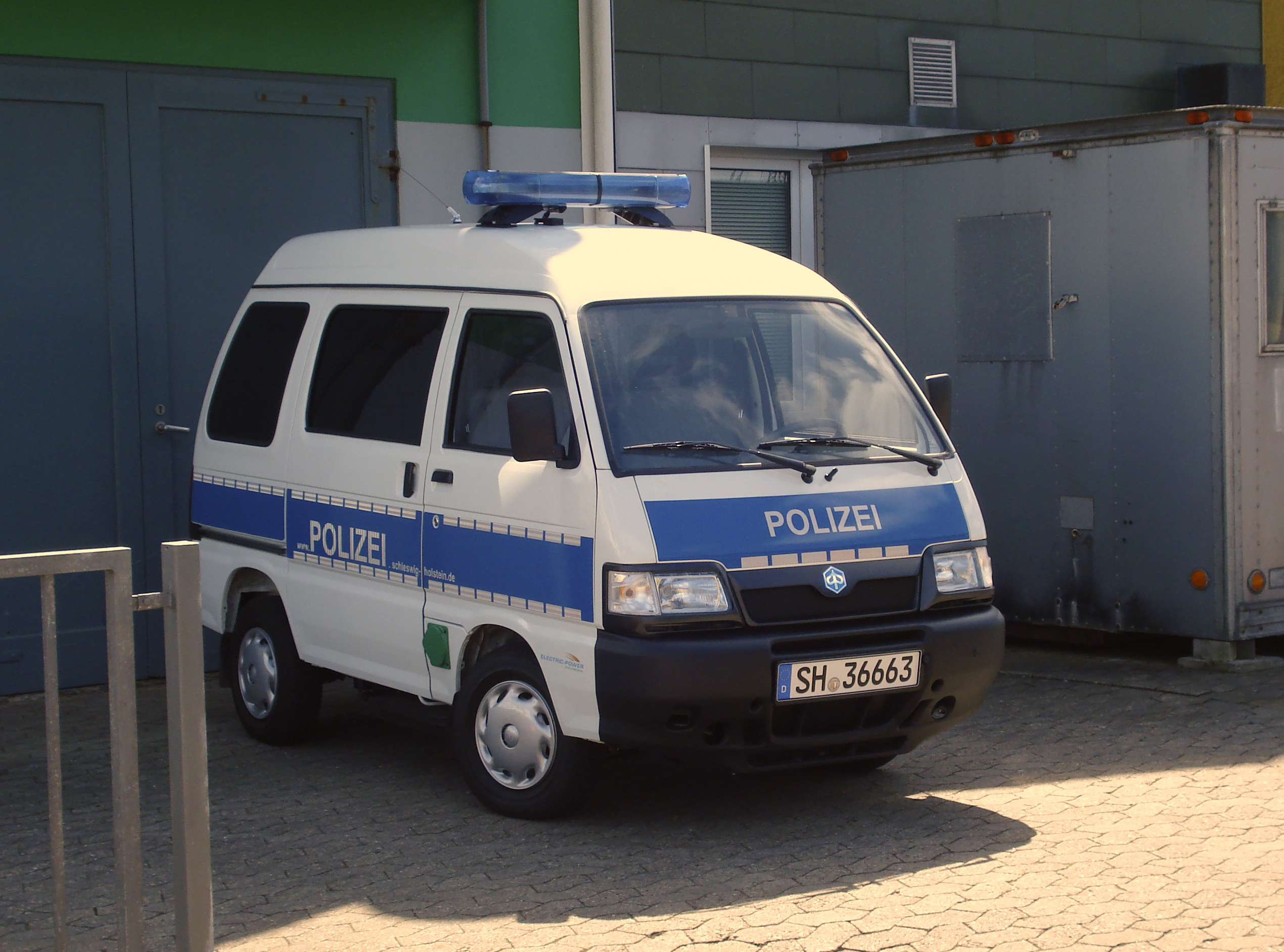
The Heligoland police van

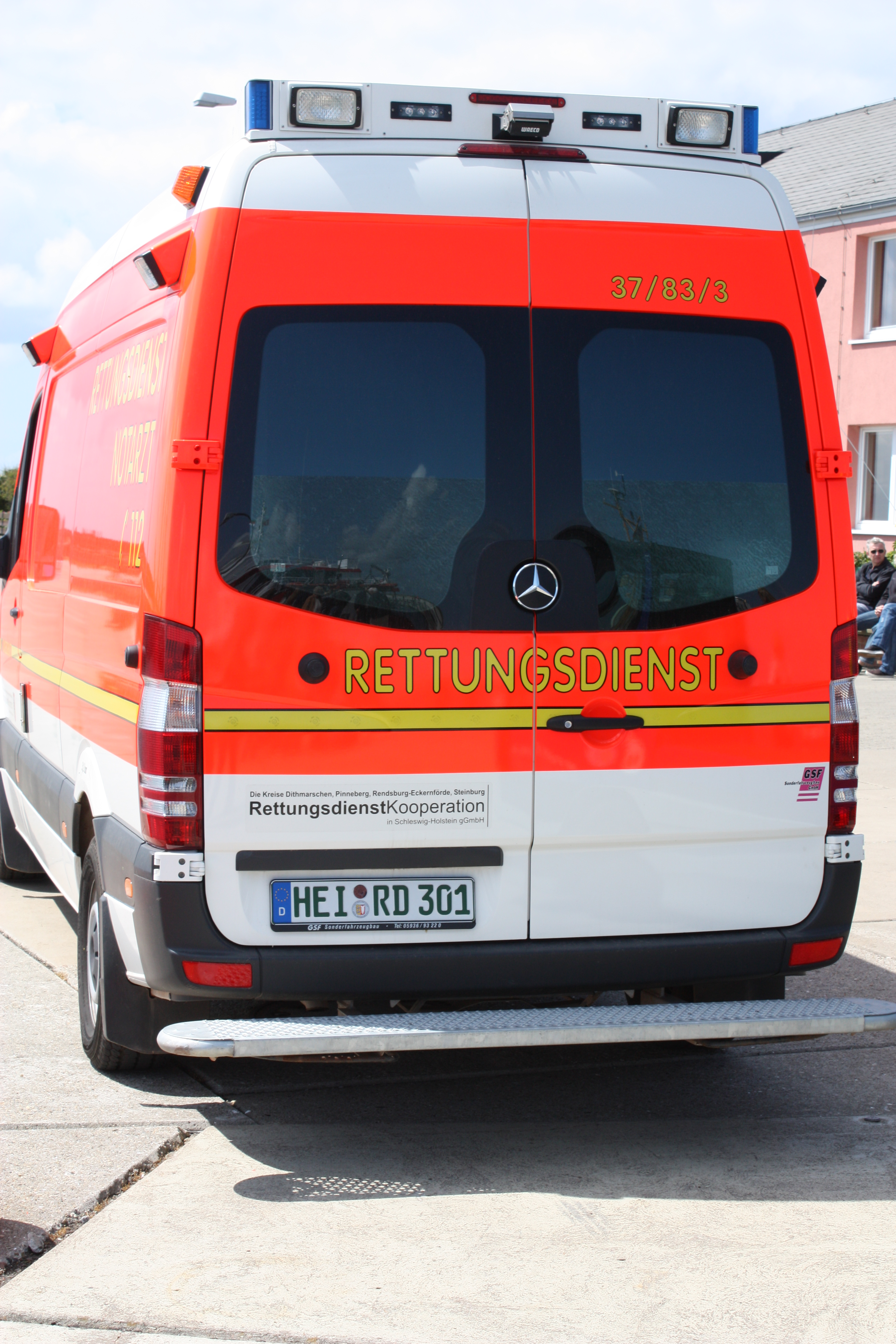
The Heligoland ambulance

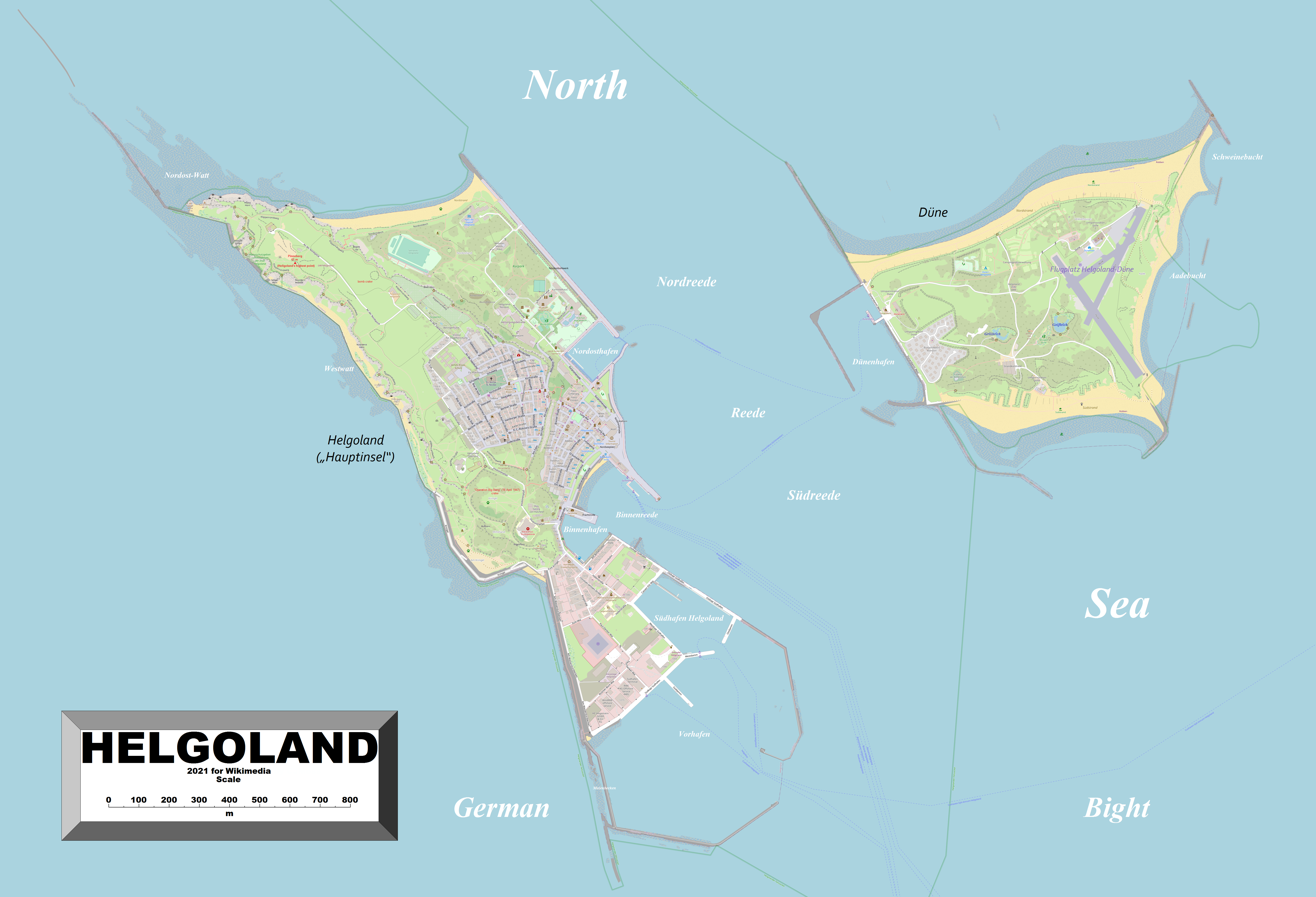
Enlargeable, detailed map of Heligoland

A special section in the German traffic regulations (Straßenverkehrs-Ordnung, abbr. StVO), §50, prohibits the use of automobiles and bicycles on the island.

The island received its first police car on 17 January 2006; until then the island's policemen moved on foot and by bicycle, being exempt from the bicycle ban.

== Emergency services ==
Ambulance services are provided by the Paracelsus North Sea Clinic Helgoland in co-operation with the State Rescue Service of Schleswig-Holstein (RKiSH). There are three ambulances available: one on the main island and one on Düne; the third is in reserve on the main island.

The ambulance service drives first to the Paracelsus North Sea Clinic. In the event of serious injuries or illnesses, the patients are transferred to the mainland either with a rescue helicopter or a sea rescue cruiser operated by the German Society for the Rescue of Shipwrecked Persons (DGzRS).

If there is an emergency on the Düne, the ambulance crew takes a boat to the Düne and carries out the operation with the ambulance based there.

Fire protection and technical assistance are provided by the Helgoland volunteer fire brigade, which has three stations (Unterland, Oberland and Düne).The tasks also include ensuring fire protection during flight operations at the Heligoland-Düne airfield. Volunteer firefighters are deployed on Düne in the summer, who report for 14 days and go on holiday with their families on the island and go into action in an emergency.

There are normally five police officers based on Heligoland. They have the use of an electric car and a number of bicycles. In the summer months the population can also triple with up to 3,000 day-trippers and additional overnight visitors. Occasionally, the usual complement of police officers is supplemented by additional officers from the mainland during this period.

Since 2021, the so-called BOS centre, a joint service building for the fire brigade, ambulance service and police, has been under construction on the Oberland, and will incorporate five apartments for police staff on the upper floor.

== Notable residents ==
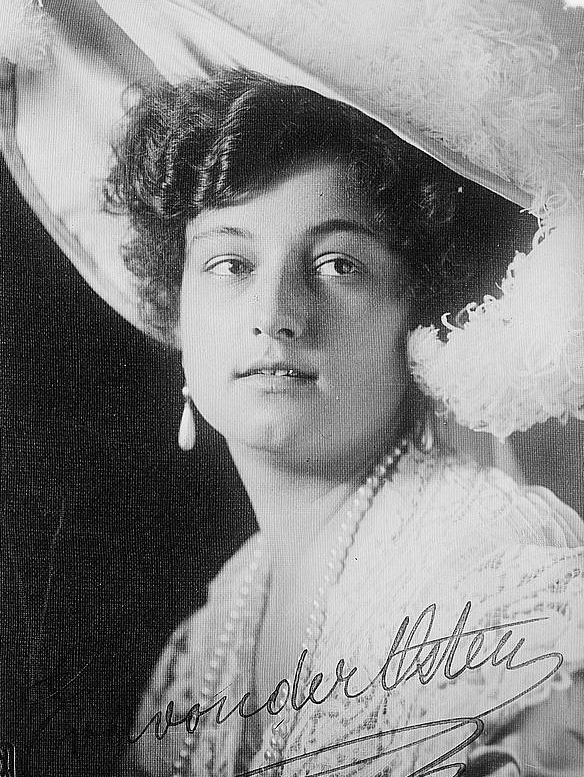
Eva von der Osten, 1918

- Peter Andresen Oelrichs (1781–1869), a lexicographer and linguist.
- John Hindmarsh (1785–1860), veteran of the Battle of Trafalgar and first governor of South Australia, the governor of Heligoland 1840–57
- Heinrich Gätke (1814–1897), artist and ornithologist, died on the island
- August Uihlein (1842–1911), a German-American brewer, business executive and horse breeder, died on the island
- Richard Mansfield (1857–1907), actor, brought up on the island.
- Robert Knud Friedrich Pilger (1876–1953), botanist born in Heligoland, specialised in the study of conifers.
- Eva von der Osten (1881–1936), the soprano, was born here.
- James Krüss (1926–1997), writer of children's and picture books, illustrator, poet, dramatist and scriptwriter

== In culture ==
- Heligoland appeared in the British Shipping Forecast up until 1956 when it was renamed German Bight. The name of Shena Mackay's 2003 novel Heligoland is prompted by its disappearance from the forecast.
- Physicist Carlo Rovelli titled his 2020 popular science book on quantum mechanics Helgoland. This is because Werner Heisenberg got the first intuition about the theory while staying on the island in the 1920s.
- In the game Battlefield 1, Heligoland Bight appeared as a map in the Turning Tides expansion DLC with the German army defending against the British Royal Marines.
- In the board game Diplomacy (game), the Helgoland Bight protects the German home supply center of Kiel from direct invasion via the North Sea (but thus also prevents German units in Kiel from entering the North Sea directly).
- Composer Anton Bruckner wrote a cantata in 1893 titled Helgoland commemorating Britain's gift of the island to Germany a few years earlier. It was Bruckner's last completed work.
- British trip-hop group Massive Attack named their 5th studio album after the island.

== Leaders of Heligoland ==
=== Lieutenant-Governors ===
Flag of the Lieutenant-Governor of British Heligoland

The British Lieutenant-Governors of Heligoland from 1807 to 1890 were:

- 1807–1808: Corbet James d'Auvergne
- 1808–1815: William Osborne Hamilton (1750–1818)
- 1815–1840: Sir Henry King
- 1840–1856: Sir John Hindmarsh
- 1857–1863: Richard Pattinson Jr.
- 1863–1881: Sir Henry Berkeley Fitzhardinge Maxse
- 1881–1888: Sir John Terence Nicholls O'Brien
- 1888–1890: Arthur Cecil Stuart Barkly

== See also ==
- Forseti – a Norse god whose central place of worship was at Heligoland
- Location hypotheses of Atlantis – Heligoland is hypothesized as a possible location for Atlantis by the Austrian-born author Jürgen Spanuth.
- Postage stamps and postal history of Heligoland
- Heligoland–Zanzibar Treaty
