= Postage stamps and postal history of Heligoland =

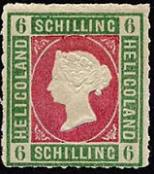
6 schilling Heligoland stamp

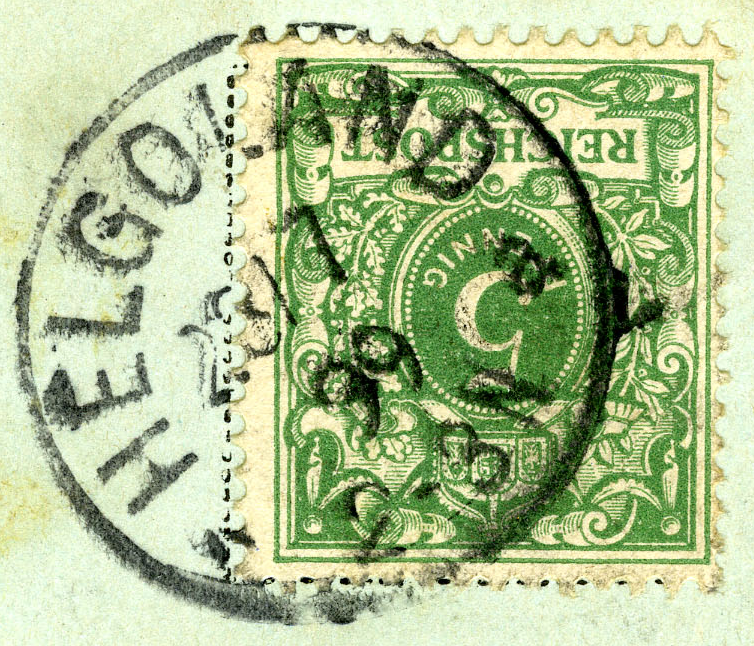
Postmark from Heligoland, dated 1899-07-23. Non-'Germania' 5 pfennig stamp.

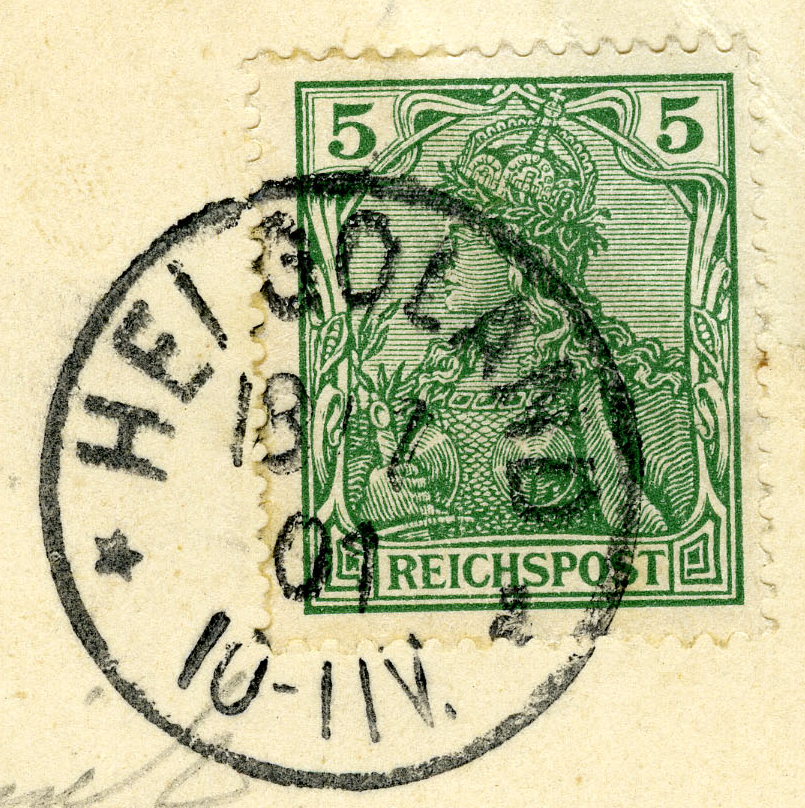
Postmark from Heligoland, dated 1901-07-18. 5 pfennig 'Germania stamp'.

During the period when Heligoland (a German island in the North Sea) was a British possession, about 20 postage stamps were issued between 1867 and 1890. There were up to eight printings of a single denomination and also a large volume of reprints which are known as the Berlin, Leipzig and Hamburg Reprints, respectively. The Berlin reprints are sometimes better quality than the originals. The reprints were done between 1875 and 1895. Consequently, many "old" collections contain reprints rather than originals. Some believe there were seven million reprints as compared to the known 1½ million originals, of which perhaps half were sold through the post office and the remainder sold to dealers when withdrawn from use. A few printings were never postally sold but nevertheless found their way into the hands of dealers. The stamps were printed by the Prussian State Printing Office in Berlin. They were denominated in the Hamburg Schilling until 1875, when both German Reich and British values appeared on each stamp issue (the Farthing/Pfennig issues). All are embossed with a silhouette of Queen Victoria excepting the four highest values which represent Heligoland escutcheons.

Mint stamps of Heligoland are moderate to medium priced but with some running to 1000 euros (2005) rarities. Some used stamps have brought 4800 euros at auction and some covers have brought 10 or 12 thousand euros. This is an inducement for forgery. Because used stamps are often more valuable than mint stamps, forged postal cancellations are plentiful and are the rule on purported high-value items. Because of the many forged cancellations and many reprints collectors of Heligoland stamps are advised either to become expert or to rely on specialists; most reputable dealers will not handle them because of the prevalence of reprints and forgeries. The collector who wishes to become expert is advised to acquaint himself with the Michel Deutschland Spezial Katalog and acquire, at least, Helmuth Lemberger's "Helgoland Philatelie". Most of the philatelic literature is in German.

The Heligoland post office used German-style adhesive paper seals to close official post office envelopes. At least two examples of a pale blue version are known to exist, together with one red.

== Postal stationery ==
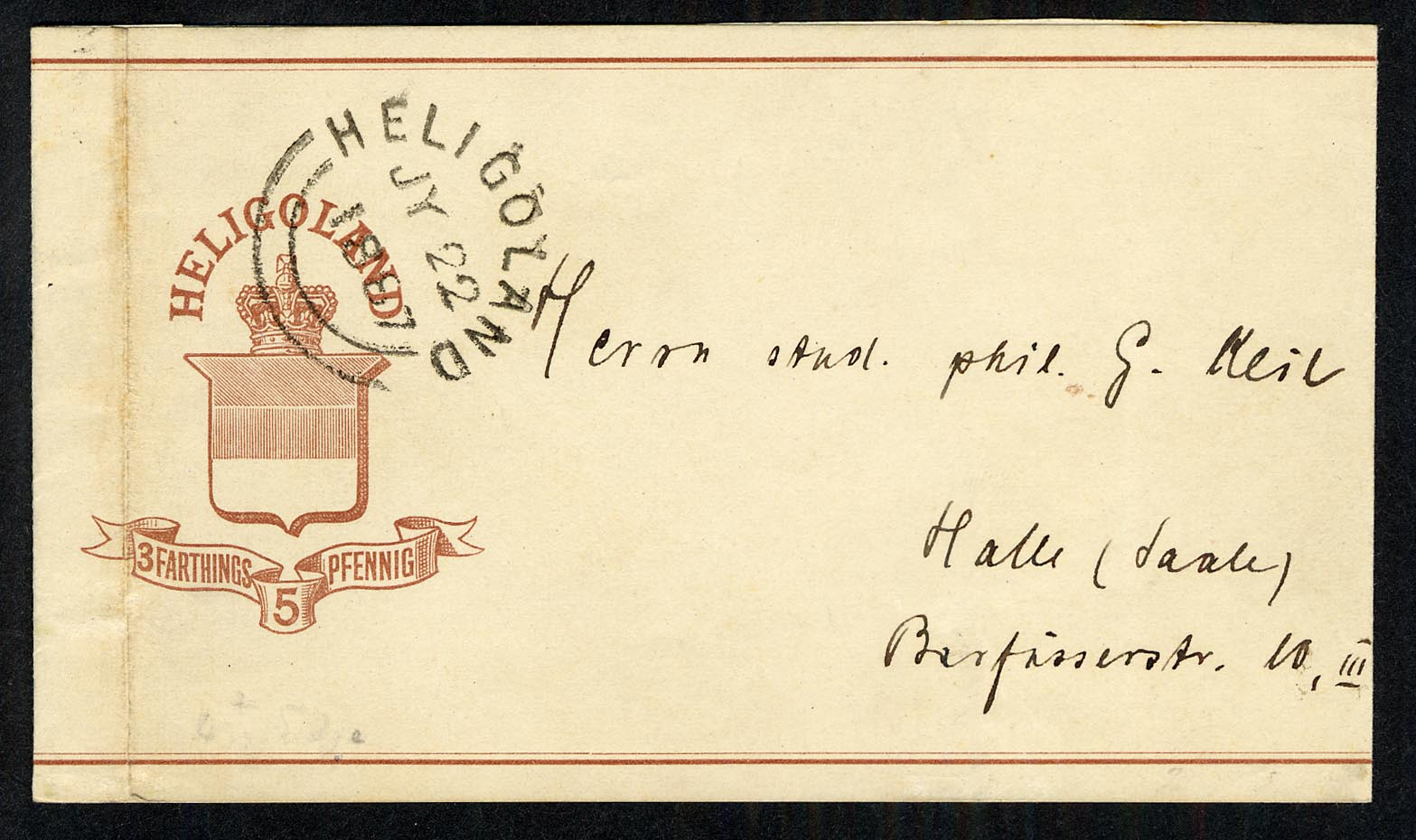
A 3 farthings / 5 pfennig newspaper wrapper used 22 July 1887

The only postal stationery to be issued by Heligoland were envelopes, postcards, reply postcards and newspaper wrappers. - a total of just 11 items. Just like the stamps of Heligoland many of these items were reprinted using the original plates.

Two different envelopes were issued, a 1½ pence/10 pfennige in 1875 and a 2½ pence/20 pfennige in 1879 both with an embossed head of Queen Victoria.

Three reply postcards were issued, a 3 farthing/5 pfennige (x2) in 1876, with an embossed head of Queen Victoria, a 1½ pence / 10 pfennige (x2) overprint in 1879 on the issue of 1876 and a 5 farthing/ 10 pfennige (x2) in 1879, with the arms of Heligoland.

Three different postcards were issued, one in 1879 both with a face value of 1½ pence / 10 pfennige overprinted on an unissued 3 farthing/5 pfennige postcard, one in 1878 with a design incorporating the arms of Heligoland and a similar one in 1879, both with a value of 5 farthing/ 10 pfennige.

On 13 February 1878 three different newspaper wrappers, with a design incorporating the arms of Heligoland, were issued, a 2 farthings/ 3 pfennige in green, 3 farthings/5 pfennige in brown and a 1½ pence /10 pfennige in blue. The 2 farthings/ 3 pfennige wrapper is the only wrapper known to have been reprinted in the original colour as well as black, gold, rose and yellow in addition to being printed on yellow paper. A supply of 3 farthings/5 pfennige wrappers on rose tinted paper arrived after Heligoland was handed over to Germany and thus were not used for postal purposes. Forgeries exist of all three wrappers.

== Sources ==
- Oliver, Allan; Heligoland. A Specialised Listing, 2004, 106pp, pdf book
- Extensive information on Heligoland stamps
- Stanley Gibbons Ltd: various catalogues
- Encyclopaedia of Postal Authorities
- Rossiter, Stuart & John Flower. The Stamp Atlas. London: Macdonald, 1986. ISBN 0-356-10862-7
- German Seal Study Group newsletter "GSSG"
