= Heligoland Lighthouse =

Lighthouse on the island of Heligoland, Germany

Helgoland lighthouse
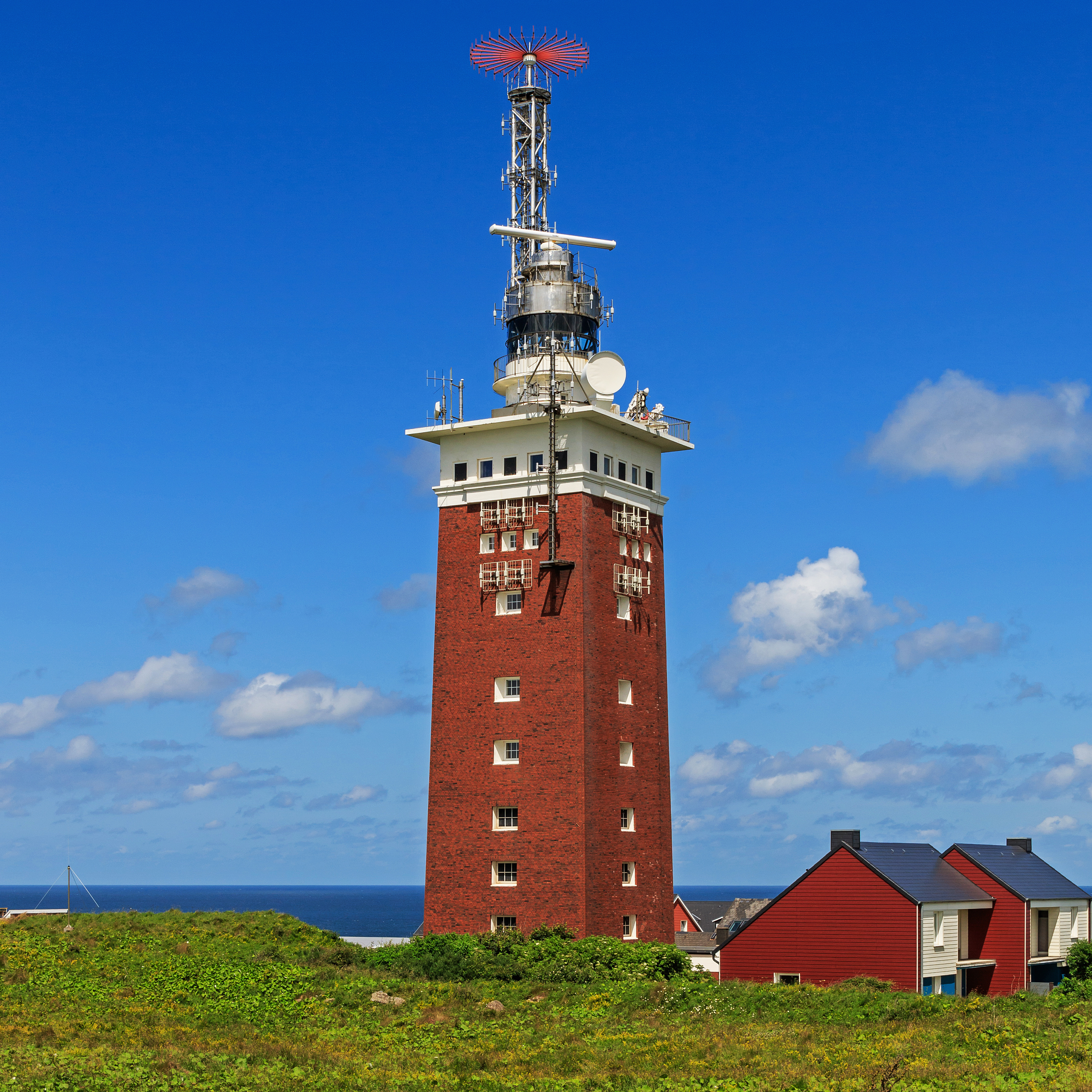
- Location: Heligoland, Heligoland, Germany
- Coordinates: 54°10′55″N 7°52′57″E

Tower
- Constructed: 1941
- Construction: reinforced concrete (tower), brick (veneer)
- Automated: 1956
- Height: 35 m (115 ft)
- Shape: square tower with balcony and lantern
- Markings: Red (tower), white (lantern)
- Operator: Wasserstraßen- und Schifffahrtsamt Tönning (–2021), Wasserstraßen- und Schifffahrtsamt Elbe-Nordsee (2021–)
- Heritage: Heritage monument in Schleswig-Holstein

Light
- First lit: 1952
- Focal height: 82 m (269 ft)
- Lens: rotator with 3 converging lenses
- Intensity: 35 megacandela
- Range: 28 nmi (52 km; 32 mi)
- Characteristic: Fl W 5s
- 1630 tower
- Constructed: 1630
- Deactivated: 1637
- 1696 tower
- Constructed: 1696
- Power source: coal
- Deactivated: Unknown
- 1811 tower
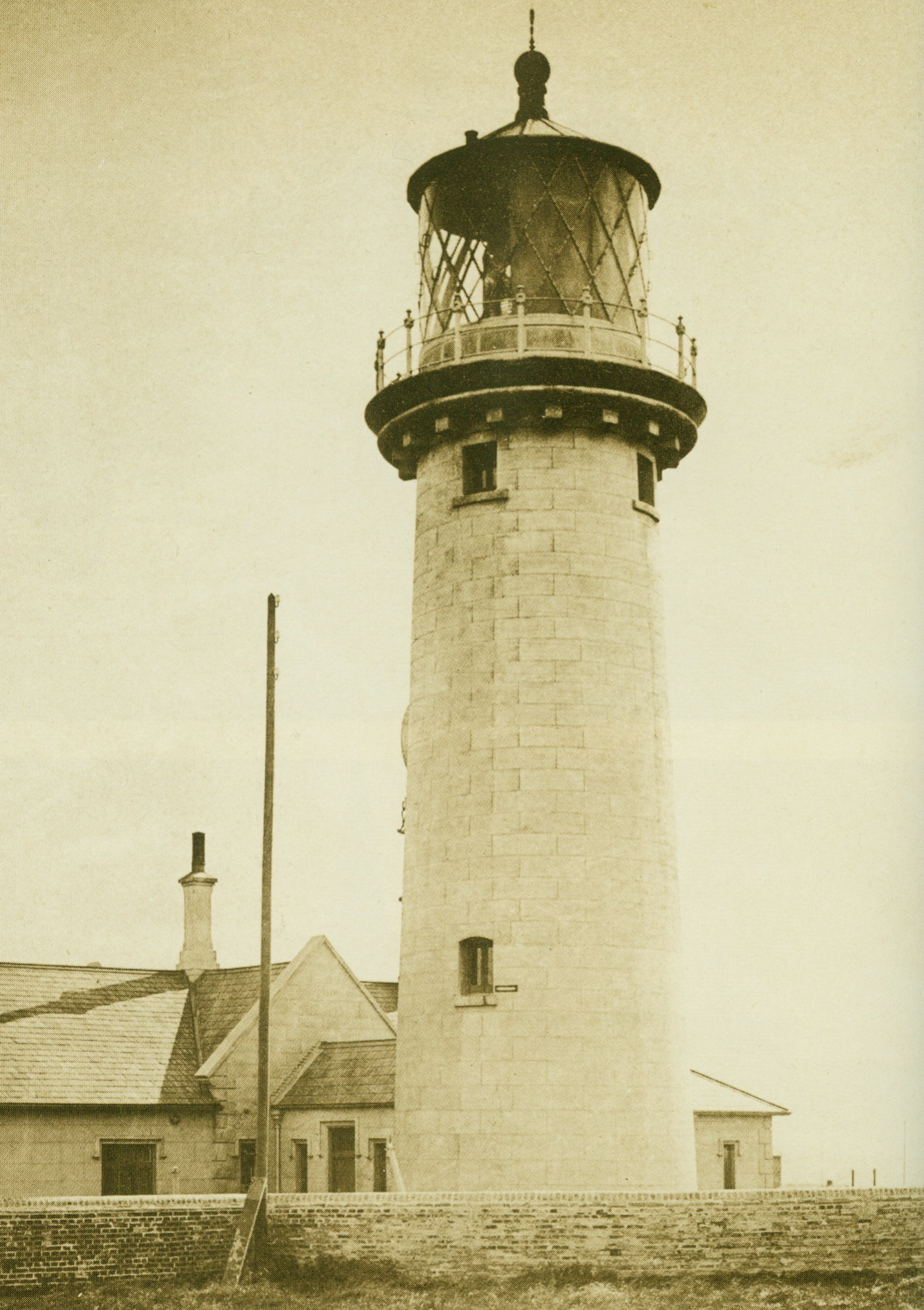
- Constructed: 1810
- Designed by: Daniel Asher Alexander
- Construction: stone (tower)
- Height: 18 m (59 ft)
- Operator: Trinity House (1836–)
- First lit: February 1811
- Focal height: 67 m (220 ft)
- Lens: first order Fresnel lens (1876–)
- Range: 20 nmi (37 km; 23 mi)
- Characteristic: F W
- 1902 tower
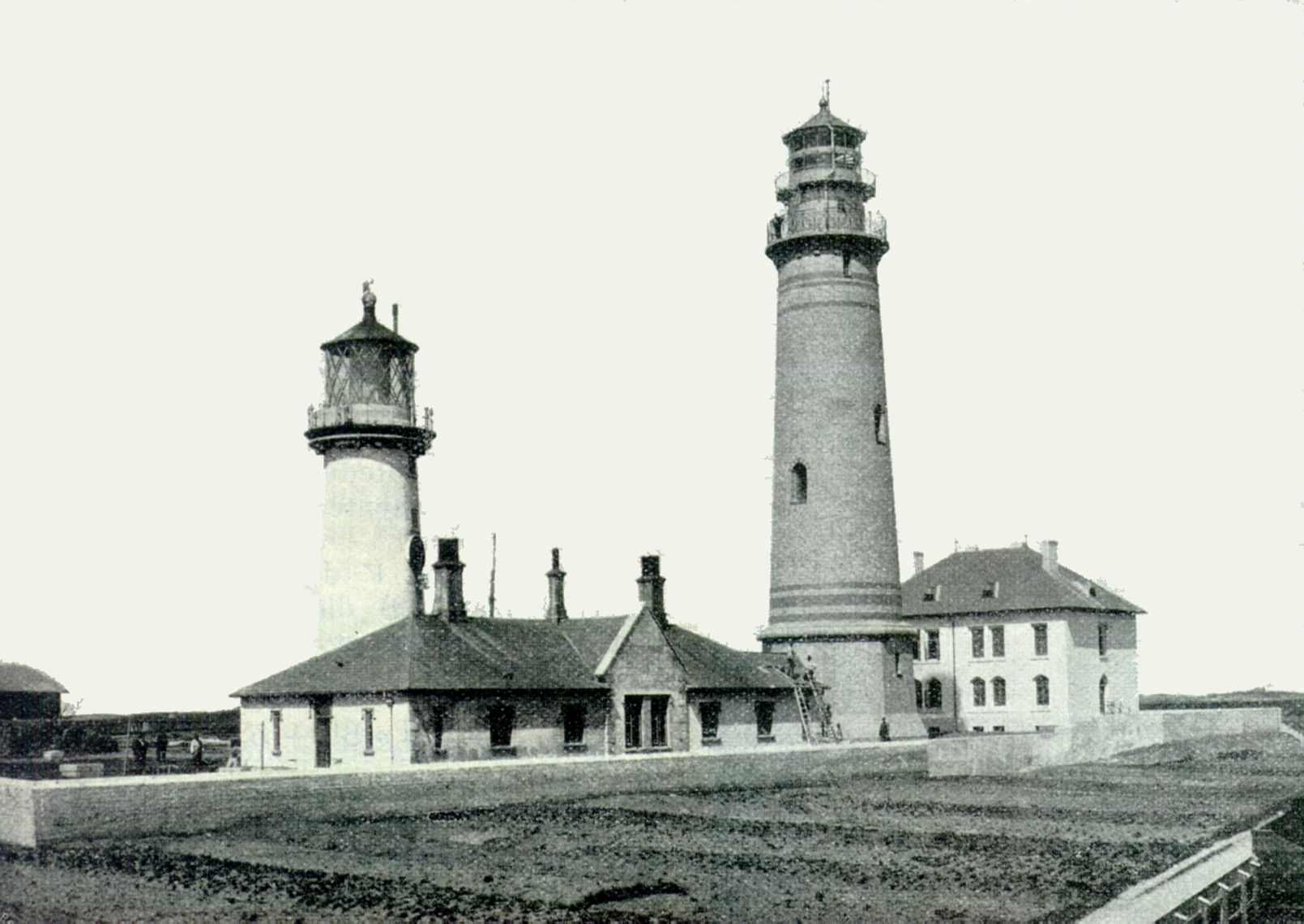
- The newer lighthouse (right) as seen in 1903 alongside its predecessor, the "English lighthouse" of 1811.
- Constructed: 1902
- Construction: stone (tower)
- Height: 36 m (118 ft)
- Deactivated: 1945

Heligoland Lighthouse (German: Leuchtturm Helgoland) is located on Germany's only offshore island, Heligoland. Constructed during World War II as an anti-aircraft tower, it was turned into a lighthouse in 1952. It features the strongest light on the German North Sea coast with a range of 28 nautical miles (52 km) so that it can be seen as far as on the East Frisian or the North Frisian islands and Halligen. The lighthouse is operated by the Tönning water and shipping authority.

== History ==
=== 17th century ===
In 1630 a lighthouse was established for the first time on Heligoland by the Duke of Schleswig; in return for maintaining the coal-fired light he claimed 'fire money'(German: Feuergeldern) of one Lübeck shilling per Last from ship owners in Hamburg, Bremen, Stade and the Ducal ports. The lighthouse ran at a loss for several years, and it ceased operating in 1637.

In 1676 a new Heligoland lighthouse was established by the City of Hamburg. High-quality coal was imported from Scotland as fuel for the light, which initially operated only during the winter months (though from 1761 onwards it would be lit all the year round).

=== 18th century ===
The coal-fired lighthouse was maintained on Heligoland through 1700s. In 1705 an agreement was made between the Danish government and the City of Hamburg, which saw the latter take responsibility for maintaining the building, supplying it with coal and paying the keeper's salary (all to be financed by the levying of dues on vessels navigating the Elbe). It was described as follows, shortly before its decommissioning:

On a small eminence, about two hundred yards from the houses, stands the light house, in which a large coal fire is constantly kept both summer and winter. The beacon is not high of itself, but as the rising ground on which it stands is two hundred and sixteen feet above the level of the sea, the light house may be distinguished at an immense distance, and according to the report of sea-faring men, it surpasses in this respect, most of the light-houses in the European seas.

According to the same description, the lighthouse was said to have consumed 'upwards of four thousand pounds weight of coals a night, during the dark and stormy winter season'.

=== 19th century ===
Not long after the British Administration of Heligoland came into effect, the British Government ordered that the lighthouse be rebuilt and converted to oil illumination. The new lighthouse was designed by Daniel Alexander to stand on the highest point of the island: construction began in 1810 and it was first lit in February, 1811. The cost of the lighthouse, including adjacent dwelling houses for the keepers, was £8,618 14s 6d. Once the new lighthouse was operational the old lighthouse was decommissioned, but its tower was left standing and it went on to serve as a signal tower, until 1916 (when it was demolished as it obstructed the line of fire of the island's coastal artillery).

The so-called "English lighthouse" (englischer Leuchtturm) was 67 metres (220 ft) above mean sea level. It constituted an important aid to navigation in the German Bight because its light was visible roughly twice as far as that of Cuxhaven Lighthouse, which had been established a few years before. As well as signalling the position of the island, it served to aid ships entering or departing from the rivers Elbe and Weser. By an Act of Parliament of 1836, the ownership and management of the lighthouse was transferred from the British Crown to the Corporation of Trinity House.

The English lighthouse was torn down soon after the inauguration of a new building in 1902.

=== 20th century ===
The construction of the new lighthouse was ordered by the Prussian administration in 1902. This lighthouse was in service from 1902 until its war-time destruction in 1945. It was built as a round brick tower from the same plans as the Cape Arkona light on Rügen in the Baltic Sea. During a bombing raid on Heligoland on 18 April 1945 by the Royal Air Force, this lighthouse was destroyed and the keeper was killed.

In 1941 a square-shaped anti-aircraft tower made of heavily reinforced concrete had been built on Heligoland. It was the only building to survive the detonation of 6,700 tonnes of explosives by the Royal Navy on the island on 18 April 1947 which was meant to destroy the military facilities and bunkers inside the rock of the island. In 1952 this tower was modified to serve as a makeshift lighthouse. The current shape with a brick veneer was formed in a 1965 renovation. Later a radar sensor, Marine and mobile radio telephony devices and an electric beacon were added on top of the lantern house.

== Optics and characteristic ==
The light characteristic of the current Heligoland Lighthouse is one flash every 5 seconds (FL 5s). The range is 28 nautical miles and is comparably high for the lighthouses of the German North Sea coast.

The English lighthouse of 1811 was equipped with 24 Argand lamps and reflectors, which displayed a fixed white light visible at a distance of up to 20 nautical miles (37 km; 23 mi). In 1876 these were replaced by Trinity House with a fixed first order Fresnel lens array, designed and manufactured by John Hopkinson of Chance Brothers in Birmingham, UK. After decommissioning, the lantern and optics of the English lighthouse were moved to Fehmarn island in the Baltic Sea where they were mounted at Staberhuk Lighthouse and are still in use today.

The 1902 lighthouse was lit by electricity. In an unusual arrangement arc lights were combined with silvered glass parabolic reflectors to form a rotating array of three searchlights, which produced a flash once every five seconds. In addition a fourth searchlight, mounted above the other three, revolved at three times the speed of the others to produce an intervening flash. Each beam of light had an intensity of 30,000,000 candlepower. The equipment was designed and built by Siemens in Nuremberg.

The optics of the current lighthouse were modernised in 1963. The device is made up of three converging lenses in two planes which are mounted with an angular separation of 120° on an electric rotator. These lenses have a focus of 250 millimetres (9.8 in) and are lit by a 2,000 Watts xenon arc lamp. With a light intensity of 35 million candela Heligoland is the strongest light along the German North Sea coast. Since 1982 the smaller lighthouse on Düne Island, off the main island of Heligoland, is remotely operated from Heligoland Lighthouse.

The Wilhelmshaven water and shipping authority uses Heligoland Lighthouse as a relay radio station to regulate ship traffic in the eastern German Bight.

== See also ==
- List of lighthouses and lightvessels in Germany
