= Project Hummerschere =

Nazi construction project

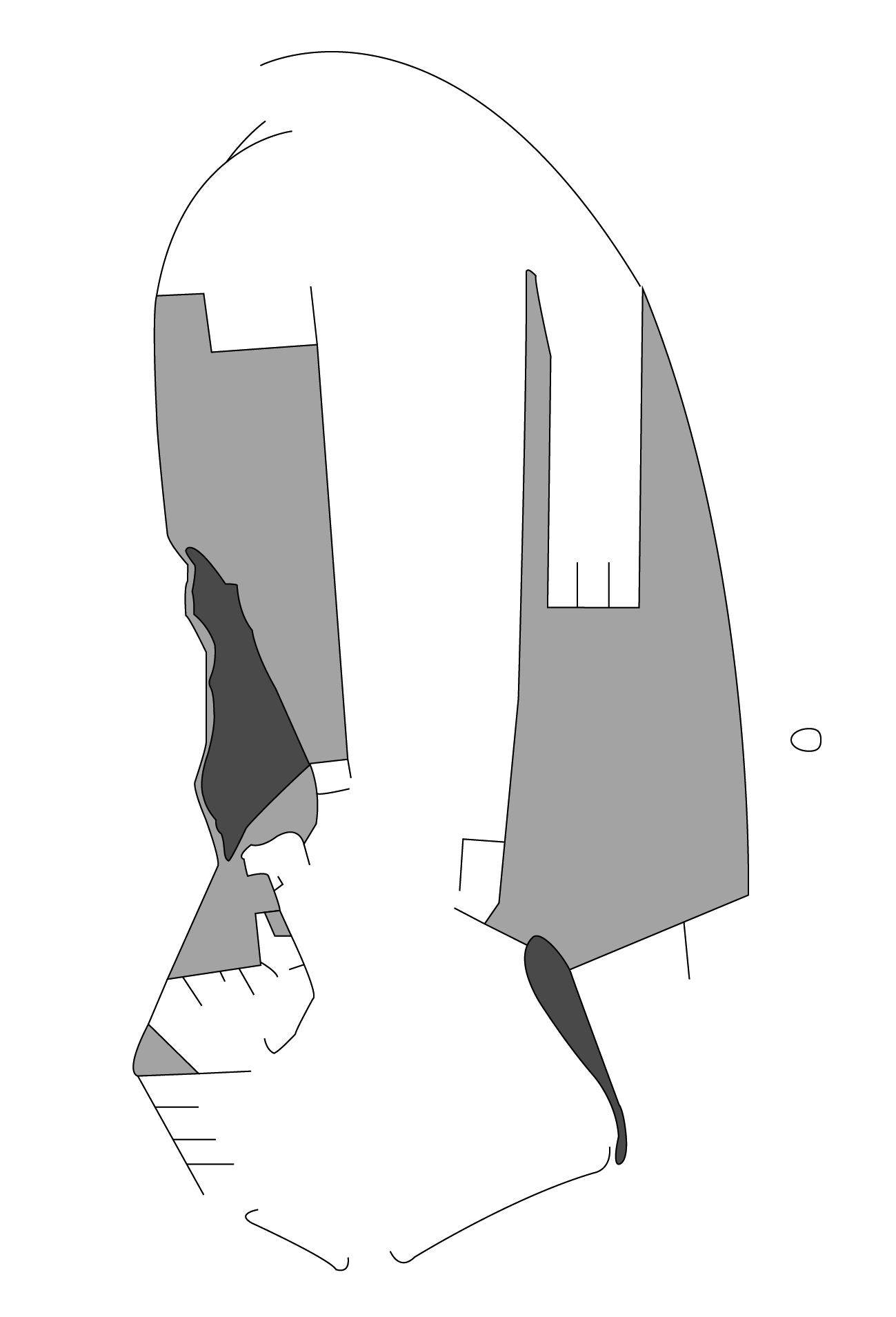
Map of the proposed Heligoland expansion by Germany in the late 1930s. Dark grey is the original archipelago, light grey is the proposed addition.

Project Hummerschere (English: Project Lobster Claw) was a construction project proposed by Nazi Germany's Kriegsmarine to expand the naval facilities on the island of Heligoland in the years leading up to World War II. Intended to create a large naval installation for operations in the North Sea, the plan involved expanding the island to its pre-1629 dimensions, restoring large areas which had been eroded by the sea. Construction was planned to more than double the usable area of both islands of Heligoland, allowing for the creation of a major naval base and Luftwaffe installation.

Conceived by German Admiral Erich Raeder, the extensive project began in 1937. It was enthusiastically endorsed by Adolf Hitler, who personally inspected the construction in August 1938. After the onset of World War II the island became vulnerable to British air raids, and the project was abandoned as a result.
