= Maxse =

Maxse may refer to:

- Frederick Maxse (1833–1900), British Royal Navy officer and radical liberal
- Henry Berkeley Fitzhardinge Maxse (1832–1883), British soldier & Governor of Newfoundland
- Ivor Maxse (1862–1958), British soldier
- Leopold Maxse (1862–1934), British journalist & editor
- Marjorie Maxse (1891–1975), British political organiser
