= Coefficients (dining club) =

British political discussion group

The Coefficients was a monthly dining club founded in 1902 by the Fabian campaigners Sidney and Beatrice Webb as a forum for British socialist reformers and imperialists of the Edwardian era. The name of the dining club was a reflection of the group's focus on "efficiency".

== Membership ==
The Webbs proposed that the club's membership reflect the entire gamut of political beliefs, and "proposed to collect politicians from each of the parties". Representing the Liberal Imperialists were Sir Edward Grey and Richard Burdon Haldane; the Tories were represented by economist William Hewins and editor of the National Review Leopold Maxse; and the British military was represented by Leo Amery, an "expert on the conditions of the army", and Carlyon Bellairs, a naval officer.

The club's membership included:

- Leo Amery, statesman and Conservative politician
- Richard Burdon Haldane, Liberal politician, lawyer, and philosopher
- Halford John Mackinder, geographer and politician
- Leopold Maxse, editor, National Review
- Alfred Milner, statesman and colonial administrator
- Henry Newbolt, author and poet
- Carlyon Bellairs, naval commander and MP
- James Louis Garvin, journalist and editor
- William Hewins, economist
- William Pember Reeves, New Zealand statesman, historian, and poet
- Bertrand Russell, philosopher and mathematician
- Sir Clinton Edward Dawkins, businessman and civil servant
- Sir Henry Birchenough, businessman and civil servant
- Sir Edward Grey, Liberal politician
- H. G. Wells, novelist

Wells was recruited because he was deemed "capable of original thoughts on every subject" and proved to be "an especially active member".

== History ==
The Webbs came up with the idea of the dinner club as a forum for "serious discussions and to formulate or propose political policy", but shortly after its founding the members "abandoned immediate political goals" but continued to meet and discuss issues of interest. Haldane hosted the first dinner at his home in December 1902.

In 1903 Bertrand Russell, who believed that the Entente cordiale policy would lead to war, resigned after Edward Grey espoused it in a speech. The group was further divided over the issue of Tariff Reform following Joseph Chamberlain's resignation as Secretary of State for the Colonies and the increasing dominance of the pro-Unionist membership, which favoured Chamberlain and his tariff reform policies, contributed to the club's dissolution in 1909. Amery would invite those Coefficients supporting reform to form a new club called "The Compatriots".

Printed minutes of its meetings are held by the British Library of Political and Economic Science.
