= Herbert Harley Murray =

Scottish colonial governor

Sir Herbert Harley Murray KCMG
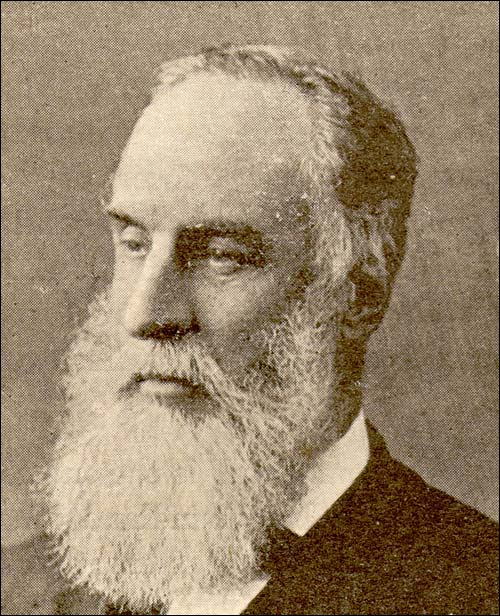

Chairman of HM Customs
- In office 1890–1894
- Monarch: Queen Victoria
- Preceded by: Sir Charles Du Cane
- Succeeded by: Sir Robert Hamilton

Governor of Newfoundland
- In office 1895–1898
- Monarch: Queen Victoria
- Prime Minister: Sir William Whiteway
- Preceded by: Sir Terence O'Brien
- Succeeded by: Sir Henry McCallum

Viceregal styles of Sir Herbert Harley Murray
- Reference style: His Excellency
- Spoken style: Your Excellency

Sir Herbert Harley Murray KCB (4 November 1829 – 11 March 1904) was a Scottish colonial governor.

A member of Clan Murray headed by the Duke of Atholl, he was born in Bromley, the son of the Right Reverend George Murray, Bishop of Rochester, by Lady Sarah Maria, daughter of Robert Hay-Drummond, 10th Earl of Kinnoull. He was educated at Christ Church, Oxford and entered the civil service in 1852. A keen amateur cricketer, Murray played first-class cricket for the Marylebone Cricket Club and the Gentlemen of Kent in 1853. He was chairman of England's Board of Customs and then acted as a relief commissioner for Newfoundland after the 1894 bank crash. Murray was made Governor of Newfoundland in 1895 and knighted that same year.

Murray tried in vain to prevent the sale of the Newfoundland Railway to Robert Gillespie Reid by trying to stop the contract from getting royal assent. Murray was critical of Premier James Spearman Winter's administration and was recalled in 1898.

Murray married Charlotte Letitia Caroline, daughter of Charles George James Arbuthnot, in 1859. They had several children. She died in 1884. Murray remained a widower until his death in March 1904, aged 74.

== See also ==
- Governors of Newfoundland
- List of people of Newfoundland and Labrador

Government offices
Preceded by Sir Charles Du Cane	Chairman of HM Customs; 1890–1894	Succeeded by Sir Robert Hamilton
Political offices
Preceded by Sir John Terence N. O'Brien	Colonial Governor of Newfoundland; 1895–1898	Succeeded by Sir Henry Edward McCallum
