= Clinton Dawkins =

Clinton Dawkins may refer to:

- Clinton Edward Dawkins (1859–1905), British businessman and civil servant
- Clinton Richard Dawkins (born 1941), British scientist
