= Terence O'Brien (colonial administrator) =

British Army officer and colonial administrator

Lieutenant-Colonel Sir Terence O'Brien KCMG
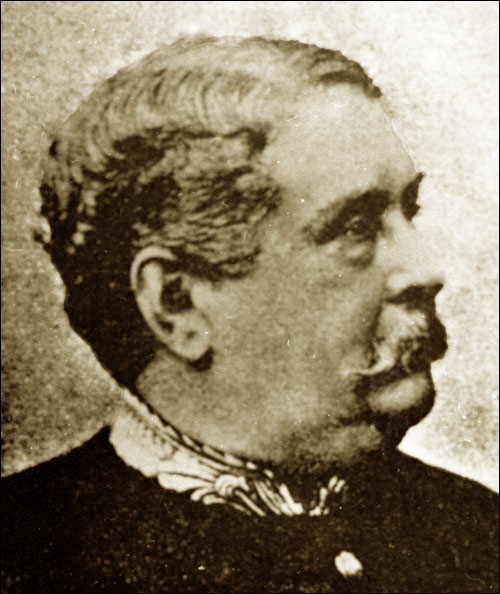

Governor of Newfoundland
- In office 1889–1895
- Monarch: Queen Victoria
- Preceded by: Sir Henry Arthur Blake
- Succeeded by: Sir H. H. Murray

Governor of Heligoland
- In office 1881–1888
- Monarch: Queen Victoria
- Preceded by: Sir Henry Maxse
- Succeeded by: Arthur Cecil Stuart Barkly

Personal details
- Born: John Terence Nicholls O'Brien; 23 April 1830 Manchester, Lancashire, England
- Died: 25 February 1903 (aged 72) London, England

Military service
- Allegiance: United Kingdom
- Branch/service: British Army
- Rank: Lieutenant-Colonel

Viceregal styles of Sir Terrence O'Brien
- Reference style: His Excellency
- Spoken style: Your Excellency

Lieutenant-Colonel Sir John Terence Nicolls O'Brien KCMG (23 April 1830 – 25 February 1903) was a surveyor, engineer and colonial governor.

Born in Manchester, England, son of Major-General Terence O'Brien (died 1865), later General Officer Commanding, Ceylon, and acting Governor of Ceylon, O'Brien studied at Elizabeth College, Guernsey, and then attended the Royal Military College, Sandhurst and was commissioned into the 67th Foot, later transferring to the 70th Foot.

He served in the Indian Mutiny War. In 1881, he was appointed governor of Heligoland, knighted in 1887 and became governor of Newfoundland in 1889.

O'Brien as governor of Newfoundland helped precipitate the 1894 bank crash by his many dispatches to London noting that Newfoundland politicians under Premier William Whiteway's Liberal Government were uniquely corrupt and incompetent. He resigned from office in 1895 and returned to London.

The Newfoundland community of Terenceville was so named in his honour.

O'Brien married first in 1853 a daughter of Captain W. Eastgate. She died in 1867, and in 1880 he remarried Victoria Temple, daughter of William Temple and widow of the MP John Fane. She died in February 1912. His son, Sir Charles O'Brien, also became a colonial governor.

O'Brien died in 1903 in London, England.

== See also ==
- Governors of Newfoundland
- List of people from Newfoundland and Labrador

Government offices
Preceded by Sir Henry Berkeley Fitzhardinge Maxse	Governor of Heligoland; 1881–1888	Succeeded by Arthur Cecil Stuart Barkly
Preceded by Sir Henry Arthur Blake	Colonial Governor of Newfoundland; 1889–1895	Succeeded by Sir Herbert Harley Murray
