= National Review (London) =

British monthly magazine (1883–1960)

The National Review was founded in 1883 by the English writers Alfred Austin and William Courthope.

It was launched as a platform for the views of the British Conservative Party. Its masthead incorporating a quotation of the former Conservative Prime Minister, Benjamin Disraeli, referring to him as Lord Beaconsfield: "What is the Tory Party, unless it represents National feeling?"

Frederick Maxse, a Liberal Unionist and Royal Navy officer, bought the National Review for his son Leopold Maxse in 1893. Leopold had taken the role of journalist and editor upon himself. When he died in 1932, his sister, Lady Violet Milner assumed those responsibilities. Lady Milner had been supporting the publication since 1928. As such, it was regarded as a family business.

Under editor Leopold Maxse, the National Review took an unfriendly attitude towards Imperial Germany in the years leading up to World War I.

The magazine was published by the Cecil Club, which became the United and Cecil Club in 1949. The magazine was renamed the National and English Review in 1950. It closed in 1960.

== Editors ==
- (1883–1887) Alfred Austin with William Courthope
- (1887–1893) Alfred Austin
- (1893–1932) Leopold Maxse
- (1932–1948) Violet Milner
- (1948–1954) Edward Grigg
- (1954–1960) John Grigg
