= Henry Maxse =

British Army officer (1832–1883)

Lieutenant-Colonel Sir Henry Maxse KCMG
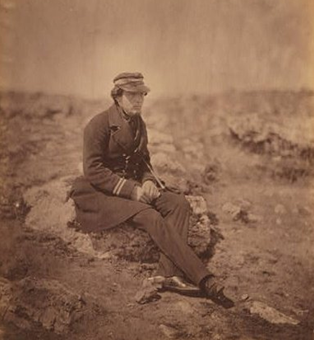
- "Fitz-Maxse" pictured during the Crimean War
- Born: Henry Berkeley Fitzhardinge Maxse; 1 January 1832; Effingham, Surrey, England
- Died: 10 September 1883 (aged 51); St. John's, Newfoundland Colony
- Resting place: Brookwood Cemetery, Surrey, England
- Spouse: Auguste von Rudloff
- Parents: James Maxse (father); Lady Caroline FitzHardinge (mother)
- Relatives: Frederick Maxse (brother); General Ivor Maxse (nephew); Leopold Maxse (nephew); Violet Maxse (niece)
- Military career
- Allegiance: United Kingdom
- Branch: British Army
- Service years: 1849–1863
- Rank: Lieutenant-Colonel
- Units: Grenadier Guards; 13th Light Dragoons; 21st Foot; Coldstream Guards
- Conflicts: Crimean War; Battle of Balaclava

Viceregal styles of Sir Henry Maxse
- Reference style: His Excellency
- Spoken style: Your Excellency

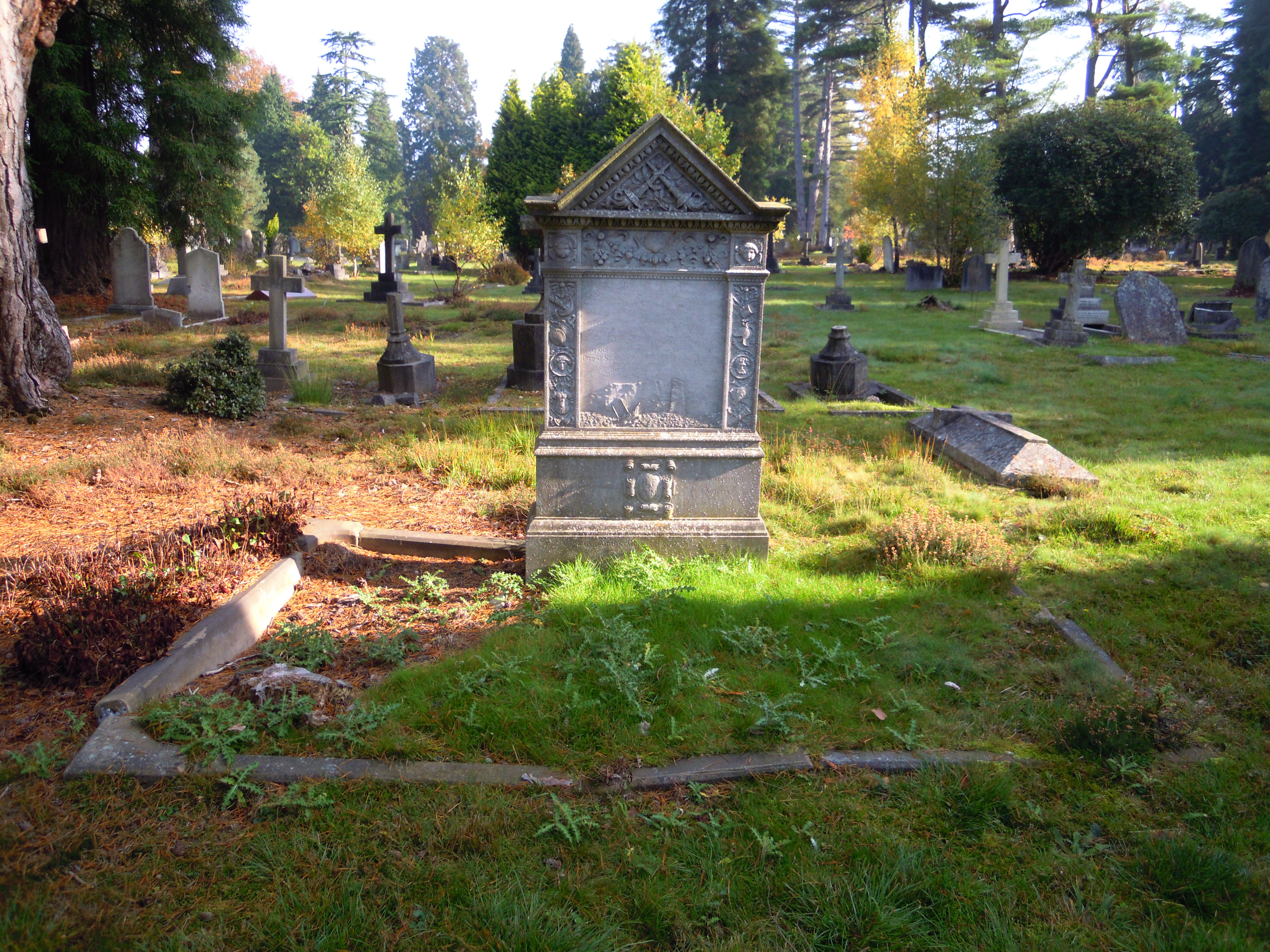
Maxse's grave in Brookwood Cemetery

Lieutenant-Colonel Sir Henry Berkeley Fitzhardinge Maxse KCMG (1 January 1832 – 10 September 1883) was a British Army officer of the Crimean War and colonial official who was Governor of Newfoundland.

== Biography ==
Maxse was the son of James Maxse and Lady Caroline Fitzhardinge, daughter of the 5th Earl of Berkeley (pronounced Barkley).

Maxse was commissioned lieutenant in the Grenadier Guards in 1849 and transferred to the 13th Light Dragoons and then the 21st Foot in 1852. He was promoted captain in 1854 and transferred to the Coldstream Guards in 1855. He was promoted major in 1855 and lieutenant-colonel in 1863.

He was wounded at the Battle of Balaclava and received medals of honour for his service. He was lieutenant-governor of Heligoland in 1863 and appointed as governor the following year. Maxse became governor of Newfoundland in 1881.

Maxse was instrumental in the construction of the Newfoundland Railway. Most of his term as governor was spent in Germany with his wife, Auguste von Rudloff (d.1915). A noted German-language scholar, he published an English translation of Bismarck's Letters to his Wife and Sisters.

Maxse died as a result of the injuries he suffered at the Battle of Balaclava. He is buried in Brookwood Cemetery in Surrey.

== See also ==
- Governors of Newfoundland
- List of people from Newfoundland and Labrador

Political offices
Preceded by Richard Pattinson	Governor of Heligoland; 1863–1881	Succeeded by Sir John Terence Nicholls O'Brien
Preceded by Sir John Hawley Glover	Governor of Newfoundland; 1881–1883	Succeeded by Sir John Hawley Glover
