= Arthur Cecil Stuart Barkly =

Governor of the Falkland Islands

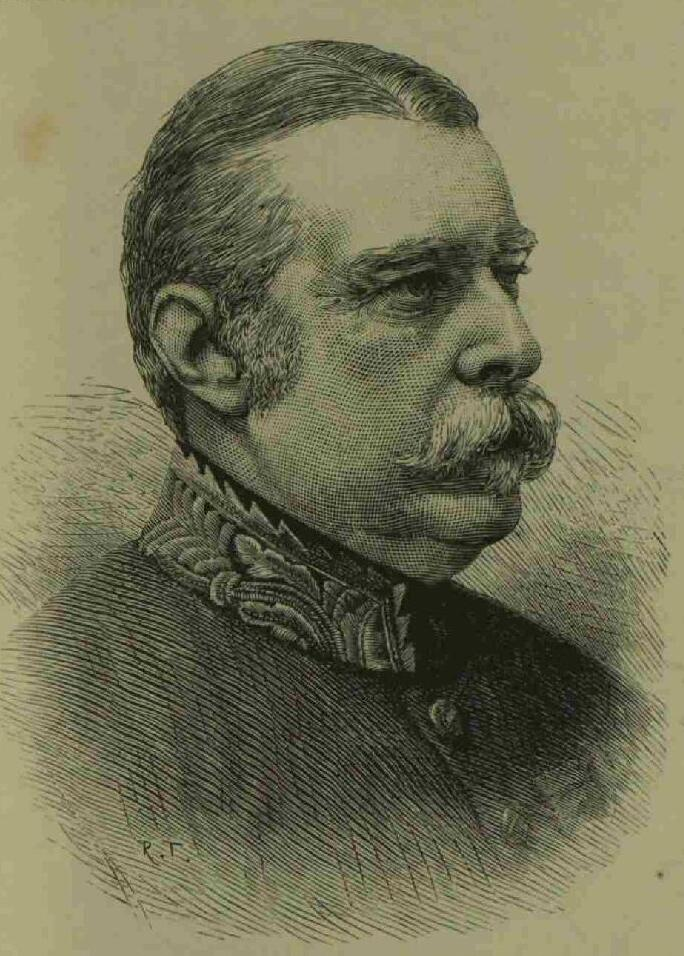
- Born: 1843
- Died: 27 September 1890 (aged 46–47); Pontefract
- Occupation: Colonial governor
- Parent(s): Henry Barkly
- Awards: Companion of the Order of St Michael and St George
- Position held: Lieutenant-Governor of Heligoland, Governor of the Falkland Islands

Arthur Cecil Stuart Barkly CMG (1843 – 27 September 1890) was a British colonial governor and judge.

== Life ==
Barkly was the son of Elizabeth Helen (born Timins) and Henry Barkly. His father was a British politician and colonial administrator. He was his father's private secretary while his father was governor of Mauritius (1863–70) and governor of the Cape Colony (1870–77).

In 1877, Barkly was appointed resident magistrate in Basutoland. He served in this position until 1881, and he became Commissioner of Seychelles.

In 1886, Barkly became Lieutenant Governor of the Falkland Islands. In 1887 he was transferred back to Seychelles and continued there as Commissioner until 1888.

In 1888, Barkly became the Governor of Heligoland. He was the final British governor of Heligoland, departing on 9 August 1890 after sovereignty over Heligoland had been passed to Germany via the Heligoland–Zanzibar Treaty.

Barkly died shortly thereafter in Stapleton Park, near Pontefract, West Yorkshire, United Kingdom.

Government offices
| Previous: Thomas Kerr | Lieutenant Governor of the Falkland Islands; 1886–1887 | Succeeded by Thomas Kerr |
| Previous: Sir John Terence Nicholls O'Brien | Lieutenant Governor of Heligoland; 1888–1890 | Succeeded by territory ceded to Germany |
