= 18th (Eastern) Division =

Infantry division of the British Army during the First World War

- Active: September 1914 – 20 March 1919
- Country: United Kingdom
- Branch: British Army
- Type: Infantry
- Size: Division
- Engagements: World War I; Battle of the Somme; Battle of Passchendaele; Battle of Épehy

Commanders
- Notable commanders: Ivor Maxse

The 18th (Eastern) Division was an infantry division of the British Army formed in September 1914 during the First World War as part of the K2 Army Group, part of Lord Kitchener's New Armies. From its creation the division trained in England until 25 May 1915 when it landed in France and spent the duration of the First World War in action on the Western Front, becoming one of the elite divisions of the British Army. During the Battle of the Somme in the latter half of 1916, the 18th Division was commanded by Major General Ivor Maxse.

== History ==
=== Formation ===
The division was formed in September 1914 during the First World War as part of the K2 Army Group, part of Lord Kitchener's New Armies. It was formed in the Colchester area but relocated to the Salisbury Plain Training Area in May 1915. Major-General Ivor Maxse took command in October 1914, leading it until January 1917.

== Order of battle ==
The following units served in the division.

53rd Brigade

- 10th (Service) Battalion, Essex Regiment
- 8th (Service) Battalion, Norfolk Regiment (disbanded February 1918)
- 8th (Service) Battalion, Suffolk Regiment (disbanded February 1918)
- 6th (Service) Battalion, Princess Charlotte of Wales's (Royal Berkshire Regiment) (disbanded February 1918)
- 8th (Service) Battalion, Princess Charlotte of Wales's (Royal Berkshire Regiment) (joined February 1918)
- 7th (Service) Battalion, Queen's Own (Royal West Kent Regiment) (joined from 55th Brigade February 1918)
- 53rd Machine Gun Company (joined 13 February 1916, left to move into 18th MG Battalion 16 February 1918)
- 53rd Trench Mortar Battery (joined 17 June 1916)

54th Brigade

- 10th (Service) Battalion, Royal Fusiliers (left October 1914)
- 11th (Service) Battalion, Royal Fusiliers
- 6th (Service) Battalion, Northamptonshire Regiment (joined November 1914)
- 12th (Service) Battalion, Duke of Cambridge's Own (Middlesex Regiment) (disbanded February 1918)
- 8th (Service) Battalion, Royal Sussex Regiment (reformed as divisional pioneers February 1915)
- 7th (Service) Battalion, Bedfordshire Regiment (joined February 1915 merged with 2nd Battalion in May 1918)
- 2nd Battalion, Bedfordshire Regiment (joined May 1918)
- 54th Machine Gun Company (joined 13 February 1916, left to move into 18th MG Battalion 16 February 1918)
- 54th Trench Mortar Battery (joined 1 June 1916)

55th Brigade

- 7th (Service) Battalion, Queen's (Royal West Surrey Regiment)
- 7th (Service) Battalion, Buffs (East Kent Regiment)
- 8th (Service) Battalion, East Surrey Regiment
- 7th (Service) Battalion, Queen's Own (Royal West Kent Regiment) (transferred to 53rd Brigade February 1918)
- 55th Machine Gun Company (joined 13 February 1916, left to move into 18th MG Battalion 16 February 1918)
- 55th Trench Mortar Battery (joined 17 June 1916)

Divisional Troops

- 6th (Service) Battalion, Northamptonshire Regiment (left November 1914)
- 10th (Service) Battalion, Royal Fusiliers (joined October 1914, left March 1915)
- 8th (Service) Battalion, Royal Sussex Regiment (joined as Pioneer Battalion in February 1915 from 54th Brigade)
- 15th Motor Machine Gun Battery (joined 22 July 1915, left 4 May 1916)
- 18th Battalion Machine Gun Corps (M.G.C.) (formed 16 February 1918 absorbing brigade MG companies)
- Divisional Mounted Troops
  - C Sqn, Westmorland and Cumberland Yeomanry (joined 15 June 1915, left 10 May 1916)
  - 18th Divisional Cyclist Company, Army Cyclist Corps (formed 8 December 1914, left 21 May 1916)
- 18th Divisional Train Army Service Corps
  - 150th, 151st, 152nd and 153rd Companies
- 30th Mobile Veterinary Section Army Veterinary Corps
- 219th Divisional Employment Company (joined 3 June 1917)

Royal Artillery

- LXXXII Brigade, Royal Field Artillery (R.F.A.)
- LXXXIII Brigade, R.F.A.
- LXXXIV Brigade, R.F.A. (left 25 January 1917)
- LXXXV (Howitzer) Brigade, R.F.A. (broken up 3 December 1916)
- 18th Divisional Ammunition Column R.F.A.
- 18th Heavy Battery, Royal Garrison Artillery (raised with the Division but moved independently to Egypt in October 1915)
- V.18 and W. 18 Heavy Trench Mortar Batteries R.F.A. (V battery formed 28 April 1916, left for II Corps on 19 February 1918. W battery formed 21 May 1916, but broken up by 26 November 1916)
- X.18, Y.18 and Z.18 Medium Mortar Batteries R.F.A. (formed 19 June 1916, Z battery broken up 19 February 1918 and distributed to X and Y batteries)

Royal Engineers

- 79th Field Company
- 80th Field Company
- 92nd Field Company
- 18th Divisional Signals Company

Royal Army Medical Corps

- 54th Field Ambulance
- 55th Field Ambulance
- 56th Field Ambulance
- 35th Sanitary Section (left 24 March 1917)

== Battles ==
1916

- First Battle of the Somme
  - Second Battle of Albert
    - Capture of Montauban
  - Battle of Bazentin Ridge
    - First Capture of Trônes Wood: 14–15 July 1916.
  - Battle of Delville Wood
  - Battle of Thiepval Ridge
  - Battle of the Ancre Heights
    - Capture of Schwaben Redoubt
    - Capture of Regina Trench
  - Battle of the Ancre

1917

- Operations on the Ancre
  - Actions of Miraumont
  - Capture of Irles
- Operation Alberich
- Second Battle of Arras
  - Third Battle of the Scarpe
    - Capture of Chérisy
- Third Battle of Ypres
  - Battle of Pilkem Ridge
  - Battle of Langemarck
  - First Battle of Passchendaele
  - Second Battle of Passchendaele

1918

- Operation Michael
  - Battle of St Quentin
  - First Battle of Villers-Bretonneux
  - Battle of the Avre
  - Second Battle of Villers-Bretonneux
- Hundred Days Offensive
  - Battle of Amiens
  - Second Battle of the Somme
    - Third Battle of Albert
      - Capture of Tara-Usna Hills
      - Second Capture of Trônes Wood
    - Second Battle of Bapaume
  - Battles of the Hindenburg Line
    - Battle of Épehy
    - Battle of St Quentin Canal
  - Final Advance on Artois
    - Battle of the Selle
    - Battle of the Sambre

== Commanders ==
Rank	Name	Date	Notes
Lieutenant-General	Sir Lawrence Parsons	14 September 1914	Transferred to 16th (Irish) Division 22 September 1914
Major-General	Ivor Maxse	2 October 1914	
Major-General	Richard Lee	15 January 1917	

== See also ==
- List of British divisions in World War I
- Alan Brooke, 1st Viscount Alanbrooke, who served with this division from 1916−1917 and ultimately rose to become Chief of the Imperial General Staff (CIGS) during the Second World War
