= XVIII Corps (United Kingdom) =

- XVIII Corps formation badge.
- Active: World War I
- Country: United Kingdom
- Branch: British Army
- Type: Field corps
- Part of: Fifth Army
- Engagements: World War I: Battles of the Hindenburg Line; Battle of Passchendaele; Battle of the Somme (1918)

The XVIII Corps was a British infantry formation during World War I. It was reactivated, briefly, in Cyprus during World War II as part of a military deception.

== History ==
British XVIII Corps was formed in France in January 1917 under Lieutenant General Sir Ivor Maxse.

From its formation, XVIII Corps Cavalry Regiment was provided by A and B Squadrons, South Irish Horse and B Squadron, 1/1st Hertfordshire Yeomanry. In May 1917, F Squadron South Irish Horse replaced the Herts Yeomanry, and XVIII Corps Cavalry Regiment was also known as 2nd South Irish Horse. It was dissolved in August 1917 when the South Irish Horse went to be retrained as infantry.

XVIII Corps pursued the German forces to the Hindenburg Line and was then merged into VIII Corps in July 1918.

In 1941, during World War 2, the XVII Corps was briefly reactivated as a fictional unit, as part of the Cyprus Defence Plan deception. However, it was later renamed XXV Corps.

== General officers commanding ==
Commanders included:

- 15 January 1917 – 22 July 1918 Lieutenant-General Sir Ivor Maxse
- 22 June – 2 July 1918 Lieutenant-General Sir Aylmer Hunter-Weston
