= Leopold Maxse =

British journalist, activist and tennis player (1864–1932)

- Full name: Leopold James Maxse
- Country (sports): United Kingdom
- Born: 11 November 1864 London, England
- Died: 22 January 1932 (aged 67) London, England

Grand Slam singles results
- Wimbledon: 1R (1883)
- Education: Harrow School
- Alma mater: King's College, Cambridge
- Spouse: Kitty Lushington (m. 1890; died 1922)
- Parents: Frederick Maxse (father); Cecilia Steel (mother)
- Relatives: Violet Maxse (sister); General Ivor Maxse (brother); Henry Maxse (uncle)

Leopold James Maxse (11 November 1864 – 22 January 1932) was an English amateur tennis player and journalist and editor of the conservative British publication, National Review, between August 1893 and his death in January 1932; he was succeeded as editor by his sister, Violet Milner. He was the son of Admiral Frederick Maxse, a Radical Liberal Unionist, who bought the National Review for him in 1893. Before the Great War, Maxse argued against liberal idealism in foreign policy, Cobdenite pacifism, Radical cosmopolitanism and, following the turn of the century, constantly warned of the 'German menace'.

== Life ==
Maxse was educated at Harrow School and King's College, Cambridge, where he took no degree. While at the latter institution he was elected President of the Cambridge Union Society. He was a close friend of journalist and neo-Jacobite Herbert Vivian at Cambridge, and both were frequent visitors at Oscar Browning's apartment. He married Kitty Lushington (the model for Virginia Woolf's Mrs Dalloway), at St. Andrew's Church, Cobham in 1890. Maxse as a child had frequently visited France and via his father, he became as a young man an "intimate" friend with Georges Clemenceau.

Maxse was deeply involved in the Dreyfus affair and almost single-handedly via the National Review made the affair a cause célèbre in the United Kingdom. The British historian Ann Perry noted that the Dreyfus affair attracted almost as much media attention in the United Kingdom as it did in France as after initially ignoring the subject by 1898 the British public was deeply engrossed in the story of l'affaire, which she credited to Maxse relentless championing of the Dreyfusard cause in The National Review. In turn, Maxse had learned about the Dreyfus affair from Clemenceau, who as a journalist, lawyer and a politician had fought for the Dreyfusard cause, all the more so as the anti-Dreyfusards tended to represent groups that Clemenceau disliked such as the Roman Catholic Church. Between June 1898-November 1899, the National Review ran at least least three articles per each month about the Dreyfus affair. In August 1898, Maxse in what was described as "a brilliant piece of sheer detective genius" was the first to expose as a forgery the documents offered up by the French war minister Jacques Marie Eugène Godefroy Cavaignac that supposedly proved the guilt of Captain Alfred Dreyfus. Maxse was firmly convinced of the innocence of Captain Dreyfus, whom he described as the victim of an anti-Semitic conspiracy within the French Army and was relentless in championing his cause. At a time of Anglo-French tensions caused by the Fashoda Incident, the Prime Minister, Lord Salisbury, expressed the wish that Maxse cease annoying the French government with his claims there was an anti-Semitic conspiracy to frame Dreyfus as a spy for Germany and the real spy was another French Army officer, Ferdinand Esterhazy. Maxse ignored Salisbury's request and continued with his Dreyfusard campaign. Maxse sought to win the sympathy of the readers of the National Review by publishing in English translation the letters written by Dreyfus from his prison cell on Devil's Island to his wife and vice versa. The emphasis in The National Review was on Dreyfus as a "good Jew", a French patriot and a honorable man who deeply loved his wife and family.. Unlike other British newspapers like the Times, Maxse in the National Review engaged in the "whodunit" aspect of the affair, treating the case as a mystery to be solved along with colorful references to spies, veiled women, mysterious deaths and forgeries.

He was a member of the Coefficients dining club of social reformers set up in 1902 by the Fabian campaigners Sidney and Beatrice Webb, but would then go on to be one of the most prominent and influential of the tory Die-Hards.

The National Review did not gain a distinct voice until the early part of the twentieth century. In 1903 Maxse became an ardent supporter of Joseph Chamberlain's Tariff Reform proposals. The National Review then became the most prominent ideological mainstay of the right wing of the Conservative Party for two decades, and would flail those members of the Conservative Party who showed the slightest sign of equivocating on support for the House of Lords, the Union, and the Empire in the required manner. In 1911 he conducted the "B.M.G." (Balfour Must Go) campaign which resulted in Arthur Balfour resigning as Leader of the Conservative Party, showing that Maxse had become a force to be reckoned among Conservative opinion makers.

Maxse supported the Entente, demanded rearmament and a strong policy against the German Empire, which he considered to be the greatest threat to the British Empire. Maxse eagerly welcomed the Great War, but was critical of the government's failings. From 1917 he supported the National party against the Conservative Party leadership, whom he regarded as subservient to David Lloyd George and who would, therefore, keep him in high office.

Maxse argued that the 1918 victory against Germany gave the Allies a fleeting opportunity to destroy German power. He viewed the Treaty of Versailles as ineffectual towards that aim and blamed Allied politicians, Lloyd George especially, for bowing to President Wilson's pressure to make the treaty less harsh. Maxse believed Germany was still able to restore itself as the dominant European power.

Maxse vehemently opposed the League of Nations: in his view the League was a "front-bench affair hurriedly adopted and recklessly advocated simply and solely to please President Wilson". He claimed Hindenburg and Ludendorff controlled Germany from behind-the-scenes, regardless of which politician was in office, and that it was unnecessary to appease Germany to prevent her from going Bolshevik because Prussian militarism was still the dominant force.

The Allied intervention in Russia, aimed at overthrowing the Bolsheviks, was supported by Maxse, not just because he disliked Bolshevism but because he wanted Russia to resume her pre-revolution role of being an anti-German power. Maxse was also pro-French and pro-Polish. During 1920–1922, Maxse attacked Lloyd George for failing to "f[i]ght for a...greater France, support...Poland, sustain...Bohemia, nourish...Rumania [and] uphold our allies in Russia".

He became an outspoken critic of British Zionism, condemning attempts to occupy Palestine.

Maxse would lose influence with the advent of Stanley Baldwin as leader of the Conservative Party. On his death, Leo Amery would say that Maxse was “a vivid and lovable creature, too black-and-white in his views to be possible in politics, but a rare source of energy in old days.”

== Works ==
- The Great Marconi Mystery (London: The National Review Office, 1913).
- "Germany on the Brain", or, the Obsession of "A Crank": Gleanings from The National Review, 1899–1914 (London: The National Review Office, 1915).
- (preface), Victory or Free Trade? (London: The National Review Office, 1917).
- Politicians on the War-Path (London: The National Review Office, 1920).
