= Violet Milner, Viscountess Milner =

English socialite (1872–1958)

The Right Honourable The Viscountess Milner
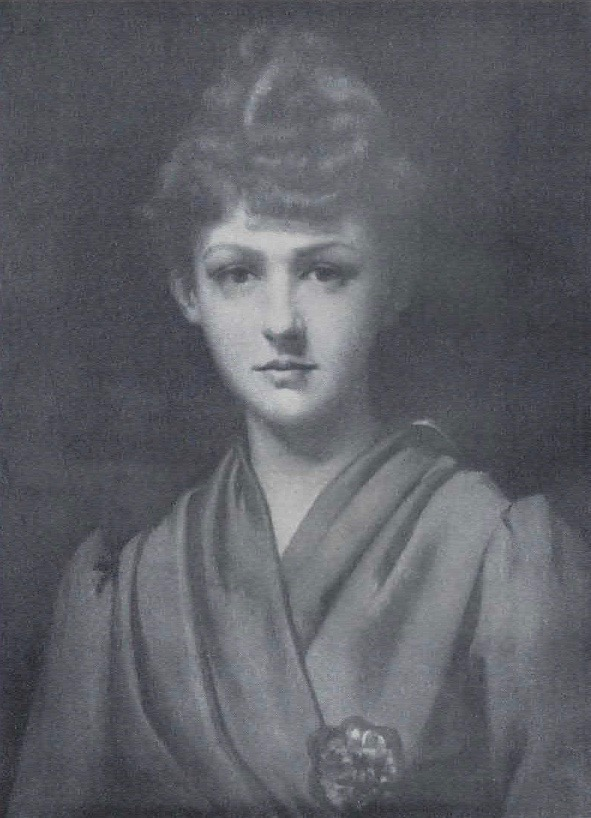
- Violet Maxse, 1888 (age 16)
- Born: Violet Georgina Maxse; 1 February 1872; Knightsbridge, London
- Died: 10 October 1958 (aged 86); Hawkhurst, Kent, England
- Spouse(s): Lord Edward Cecil (m. 1894; died 1918) Alfred Milner (m. 1921; died 1925)
- Children: 2
- Parents: Frederick Maxse (father); Cecilia Steel (mother)
- Relatives: Gen. Sir Ivor Maxse (brother); Leopold Maxse (brother); Alexander Hardinge (son-in-law)

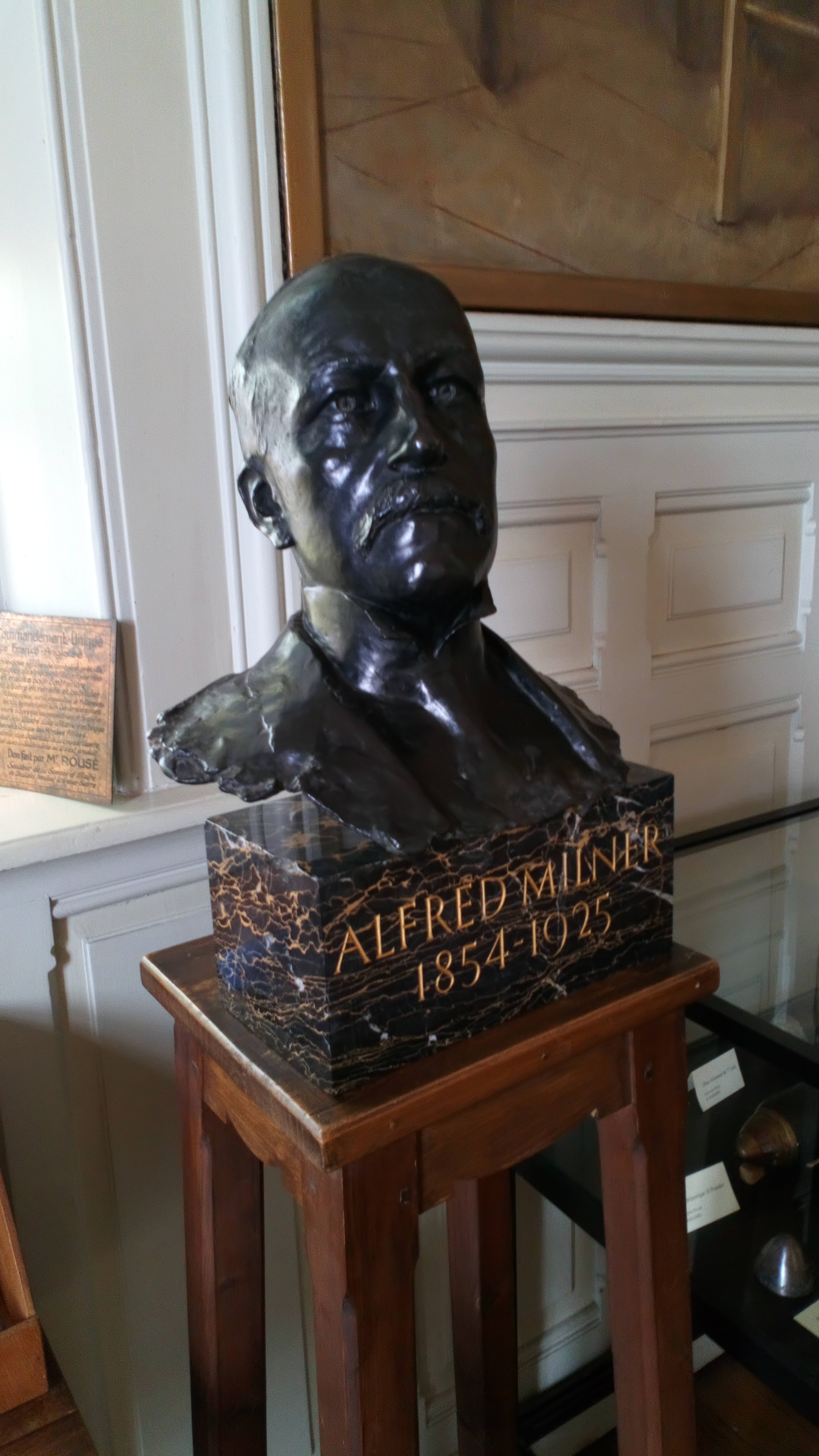
The Bust of Alfred Milner

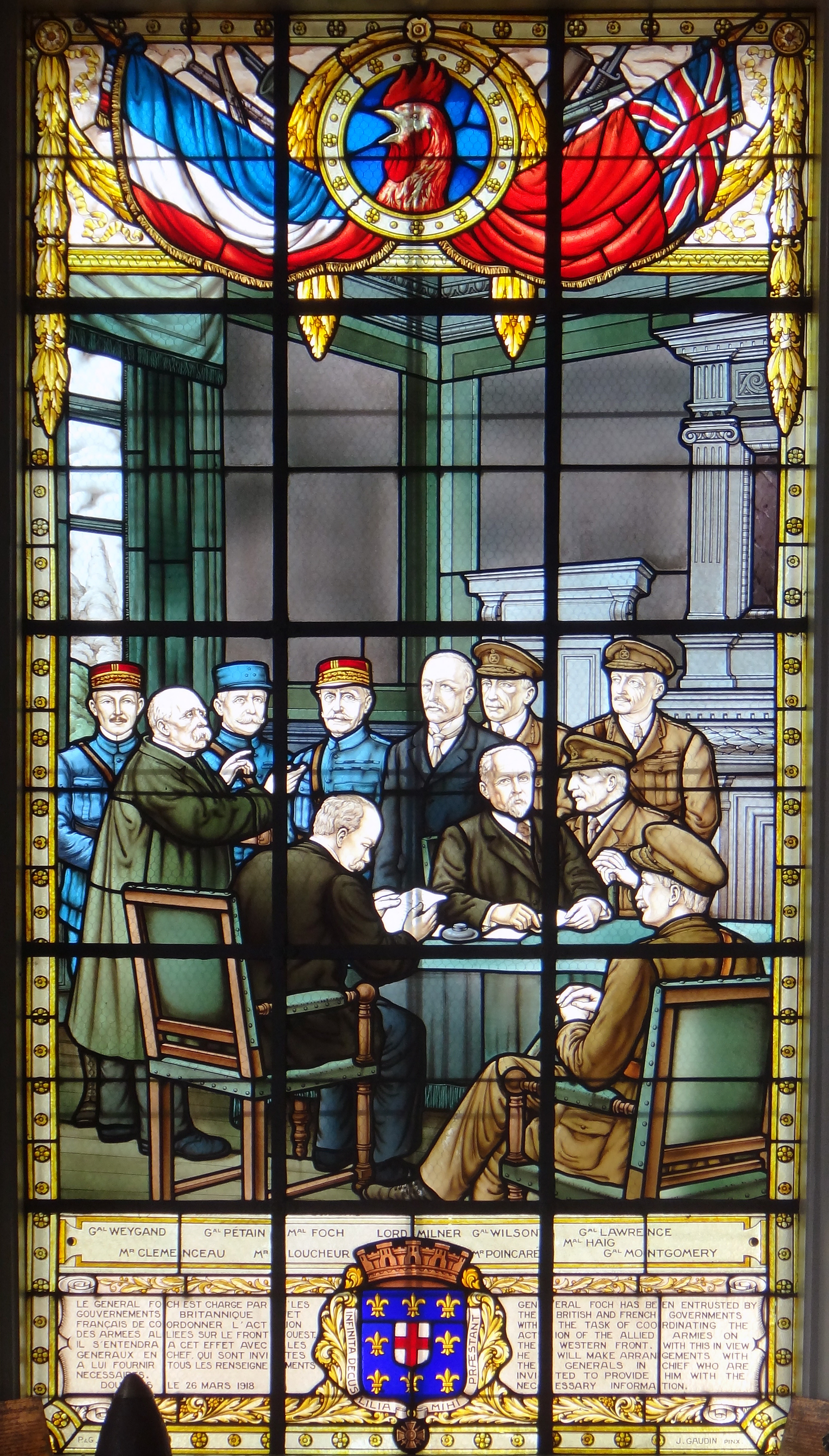
Stained Glass at the Hôtel de Ville (town hall) in Doullens, commemorating the Doullens Conference and the Unity of Command. Lord Milner is standing, centre

Violet Georgina Milner, Viscountess Milner (née Maxse; 1 February 1872 – 10 October 1958) was an English socialite of the Victorian and Edwardian eras and, later, editor of the political monthly National Review. Her father was close friends with Georges Clemenceau, she married a son of Prime Minister Salisbury, Lord Edward Cecil, and after his death, Alfred Milner, 1st Viscount Milner.

== Life ==
Violet was born at 38 Rutland Gate, Knightsbridge, the youngest of four children born to Admiral Frederick Maxse and Cecilia Steel. Her siblings were Gen. Sir Ivor Maxse (1862–1958), a British Army officer of the First World War; Leopold Maxse (1864–1932), editor of the National Review, and Olive Hermione Maxse (1867–1955), a model for Edward Burne-Jones. Admiral Maxse delivered despatches during the Crimean War, and he was one of only two outspoken supporters of the French position regarding Alsace-Lorraine after the Franco-Prussian War of 1870. This drew the attention of Georges Clemenceau, and the two became friends. As a teenager, Violet lived two years in Paris, studying music and art, often attending opera and theatre shows with Clemenceau.

One of the highlights of 1897 for Violet was Queen Victoria's Diamond Jubilee Celebration, on 22 June, when she joined the Cecil family on a stand at Whitehall to watch the parade.

With the breakdown of peace negotiations in South Africa between English and Dutch settlers, leading the Boer War in 1899, the British increased their military presence there by dispatching 2,000 soldiers. Among them was Major Edward Cecil and his wife. Arriving in Cape Town on 26 July, Violet wrote often to her cousin, future Prime Minister Arthur Balfour, in support of England and the policies of its High Commissioner for South Africa, Sir Alfred Milner. With the Cecils and Milner residing at Government House, the three were good friends and lived under the same roof until 14 August, when the Cecils were ordered to move north. When Major Cecil became trapped in the Siege of Mafeking (from 13 October 1899 to 17 May 1900), Violet stayed at Groote Schuur, the estate of mining magnate and politician Cecil Rhodes. She wrote of her experiences during this time in her autobiography, My Picture Gallery, published in 1951.

She exchanged letters with Alfred, and alongside Violet Markham and Edith Lyttelton she established the Victoria League in 1901 to promote Milner's imperial vision of the British Empire. She met up with Lord Milner again at a Christmas party held at Lord Goschen's country estate Seacox, Hawkhurst in December 1905.

Lady Milner took over as editor of the family owned, conservative journal The National Review after the death of her brother Leopold Maxse in 1932, having supported the publication since he fell ill in 1929. The magazine was known for its opposition to imperial Germany prior to the First World War, and to appeasement in the interwar years. Its editor staunchly defended Conservative leader Bonar Law.

In January 1917, French Prime Minister Georges Clemenceau, speaking to President Raymond Poincaré, famously said of Lord Milner:

"He is an old friend of mine. We admired and loved the same woman. That's an indissoluble bond."

Viscountess Milner was present in France on 11 November 1933, the 15th anniversary of the Armistice, where she dedicated a marble bust of her late husband, Alfred, in a conference room on the first floor of the Hôtel de Ville (town hall) in Doullens. It was here at Lord Milner's urging, in a conference attended by Clemenceau, Poincare, and French and English Generals on 26 March 1918, that the Western Front was united under a single command in World War I. Today, the town hall bears the inscription:

"In this town hall, on the 26th of March 1918, the "Allies" entrusted General Foch with the supreme command on the Western Front. This decision saved France and the liberty of the world."

According to Leopold Amery the decision to appoint General Foch was made a day earlier in a meeting between Lord Milner and Prime Minister Clemenceau. As General Foch was not on the list of Clemenceau's promotable generals (he was out of favour), Lord Milner's influence with Clemenceau made the decision easy. On 20 April 1918, in his first public statement after being appointed Secretary of State for War, Lord Milner said in the French newspaper Le Temps:

"Our fighters are worthy of the test they face. Attacked by divisions far more numerous than ours, they supplement the number by courage, and they decimate the assailant. We are happy to see our French allies doing them justice." "I have not waited until now, neither to understand the usefulness of a single command, nor to recognize the value of General Foch. I was personally associated with the measures which created the current organization of the command, and I congratulate myself on the cordial confidence which has constantly reigned between Mr. Clemenceau and myself." "It is not in vain that we will have shared the same anxieties fraternally, then the same joys. The days in which we are living create imperishable bonds."

Violet discussed her family's long time friendship with Georges Clemenceau in The National Review, and in her book, Clemenceau Intime.

She died on 10 October 1958, aged 86, at her home near Hawkhurst.

== Family ==
She married, firstly, Lord Edward Cecil, the youngest son of Prime Minister Salisbury on 18 June 1894 at St Saviour's Church, Chelsea. The officiant was his brother Rev William Cecil. A wide range of society guests appeared at the wedding, H. H. Asquith, John Morley, 1st Viscount Morley and Joseph Chamberlain, as well as his cousin Arthur Balfour and father Salisbury, and liberal poets Wilfred Scawen Blunt and Oscar Wilde. His mother, Lady Salisbury remarked: "It will be good for Nigs to have a clever wife and one accustomed to taking care of expenses and I hope will convert her. I don't believe in pious pagans - and my only real objection to the Souls, is their heathenry." His father warned him about her character; and settled a further £1,000 pa having settled his debts again. Lord Edward earned £200 pa in Army pay, but his wife's contribution was double that, making their life comfortable. Salisbury urged them to work on their relationship, but the marriage was unhappy.

She and Lord Edward Cecil had two children:

- One son, George Edward Gascoyne-Cecil born on 9 September 1895. He was a Lieutenant in the Grenadier Guards, and was killed in action in the First World War on 1 September 1914 on the Western Front. Rudyard Kipling, Georges Clemenceau, and former President Theodore Roosevelt helped her track down his fate.
- One daughter, Helen Mary Gascoyne-Cecil, who was born on 11 May 1901. She was an author. She married Alexander Hardinge, 2nd Baron Hardinge of Penshurst, and died in 1979.

Violet was appointed Grand Dame of the Order of St John, and Chevalier of the Légion d'honneur.

Lord Edward died on 13 December 1918 of the Spanish influenza, and she married Lord Milner at St James's Church, Paddington on 26 February 1921. Violet and Lord Milner were married 12 days after Lord Milner's retirement from Prime Minister Lloyd George's government on 14 February 1921. They had a great marriage. On 22 May 1928 she turned over important information relating to the First World War and Lord Milner's role at the Doullens Conference in France to the Public Records Office.

Upon Lord Milner's death in May 1925, Violet inherited nearly £46,000 (£2.8 million in 2020). In 1929 she donated Sturry Court, Milner's residence in Canterbury, to The King's School, Canterbury. The site now houses the Junior Kings School. (Note: Although some sources suggest Lady Milner sold the estate to the school, a letter from George Bell, Dean of Canterbury appears to confirm it was a donation; "I need not tell you again how grateful we are, or how much we appreciate the gift both of itself and for the traditions and hopes which it contains.") She continued to maintain Great Wigsell, her manor home in Salehurst, and 14 Manchester Square, their joint house in London.

== Primary sources ==
- The Times (of London) archive website
- Beaverbrook, Lord The Decline and Fall of Lloyd George, New York: Duell, Sloan, 1963
- The London Gazette
- Milner, Violet (Viscountess Milner), My Picture Gallery: 1886 - 1901, London: John Murray, 1951
- O'Brien, Terence, Milner, London: Constable, 1979
- Thompson, J, Lee, Forgotten Patriot: A life of Alfred, Viscount Milner of St James's and Cape Town, 1854-1925, Cranbury, NJ: Rosemont Publishing, 2007
- Hochschild, Adam, To End All Wars, A Story of Loyalty and Rebellion, 1914-1918, Boston: Houghton, 2011
- Cecil, Hugh & Mirabel, Imperial Marriage, London: Murray, 2002
- Carpentier, Paul, and Rudet, Paul, "The Doullens Conference", Paris: Pedone, 1933 (translated)
- Aston, George, The Biography of the Late Marshal Foch, New York: MacMillan, 1929
- Amery, Leopold, My Political Life: Volume II, War and Peace, 1914 - 1929, London: Hutchinson, 1953
- The Temps (French newspaper), Digital Archives: Link
- The National Review, Vol. 115, July to December 1940, "Clemenceau", London: The Proprietors, 1940
- Review Des Mondes, 15 February 1953, Clemenceau Intime, Paris: Revue des Deux Mondes, 1953 pdf
- Clemenceau, Georges, Grandeur and Misery of Victory, New York: Harcourt, 1930
