= Clinton Edward Dawkins =

British businessman and civil servant

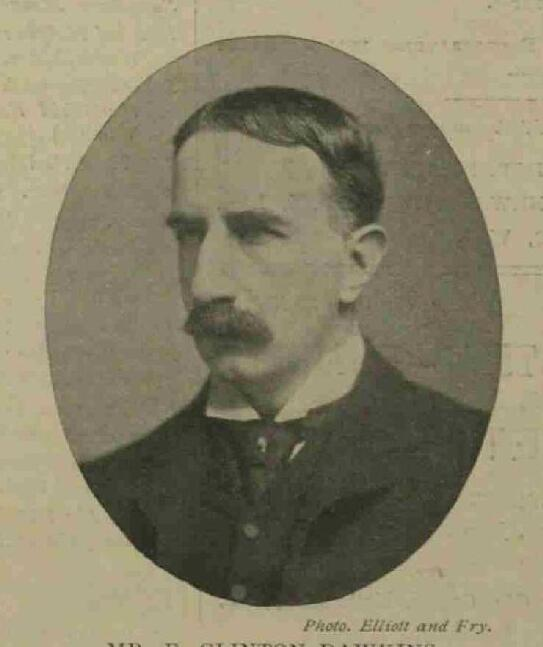
- Born: 2 November 1859; London
- Died: 2 December 1905 (aged 46); London
- Alma mater: Cheltenham College; Balliol College
- Occupation: Civil servant, banker
- Spouse(s): Louise Johnstone
- Children: 1
- Parent(s): Clinton George Augustus Dawkins; Marianne Jane Robarts

Sir Clinton Edward Dawkins, KCB (2 November 1859 – 2 December 1905) was a British businessman and civil servant.

== Life ==
Dawkins was born in London, the third son of Clinton George Dawkins, one time Consul-General in Venice, descended from the Dawkins family of Over Norton Park. His grandfather Henry Dawkins, MP for Aldborough, married the daughter of Gen. Sir Henry Clinton. He was educated at Cheltenham College and Balliol College, Oxford.

He succeeded Alfred Milner as private secretary to Chancellor of the Exchequer George Goschen in 1889. He later served overseas as undersecretary for finance in Egypt from 1895 to 1899. His final role was as financial advisor to Lord Curzon, Governor-General of India in 1899.

During 1899, he accepted an offer from the financier John Pierpont Morgan of full partnership in the London branch of his firm, J. S. Morgan & Co., where he remained until his death in 1905. He was a member of the Coefficients dining club of social reformers set up in 1902 by the Fabian campaigners Sidney and Beatrice Webb.

In recognition of Dawkins' work in chairing a Committee reviewing the Administration of the War Office, he was appointed a Knight Commander of the Order of the Bath in the 1902 Coronation Honours list published on 26 June 1902, and invested as such by King Edward VII at Buckingham Palace on 24 October 1902. He had been made a Companion (CB) of the same order in November the previous year.

In 1902 Dawkins purchased the country estate of Sir Walter Rockcliff Farquhar at Polesden Lacey. Dawkins was involved in the remodelling of the house at the centre of the estate.

Dawkins died from heart disease on 2 December 1905. He was survived by his wife Louise, daughter of Charles Johnston, and his daughter Dorothy. He was cremated and his ashes spread at Brookwood Cemetery on 6 December.

He was the three-times great uncle to British evolutionary biologist Richard Dawkins. Much like his descendant, well known as an advocate of atheism, Sir Clinton Dawkins was known for being a strident positivist at Balliol. The Balliol rhyme published about him reads:

Positivists ever talk in
Such an epic style as DAWKINS;
Creeds are nought and MAN is all,
Spell Him with a capital.

== Arms ==
Coat of arms of Clinton Edward Dawkins

Crest
A dexter arm couped at the shoulder holding a battle-axe bendwise Proper thereon a rose Gules.
Escutcheon
Gules a lion passant guardant Or between two roses in pale Argent as many flaunches of the second each charged with a lion rampant Sable.
