= Frederick Maxse =

Royal Navy Admiral and radical (1833–1900)

Admiral Frederick Maxse
- Born: 13 April 1833; London, England
- Died: 25 June 1900 (aged 67); London, England
- Occupations: Royal Navy officer & campaigner
- Spouse: Cecilia Steel
- Children: 4
- Parents: James Maxse (father); Lady Caroline FitzHardinge (mother)
- Relatives: Henry Maxse (brother); Frederick Berkeley (father-in-law); General Ivor Maxse (son); Leopold Maxse (son); Violet Maxse (daughter)
- Military career
- Allegiance: United Kingdom
- Branch: Royal Navy
- Service years: 18??-1867
- Rank: Admiral
- Conflicts: Crimean War; Battle of the Alma

Admiral Frederick Augustus Maxse (13 April 1833 – 25 June 1900) was a British Royal Navy officer and radical liberal campaigner.

== Early life ==
Maxse was born in London, the son of James Maxse and Lady Caroline FitzHardinge, daughter of Frederick Augustus, 5th Earl of Berkeley. His elder brother was Sir Henry Berkeley Fitzhardinge Maxse.

== Career ==
Maxse was naval aide-de-camp to Lord Raglan after the Battle of the Alma on 20 September 1854 in the Crimean War. He was an atheist and vegetarian.

Maxse retired from the Royal Navy in 1867, but failed in his attempts to get elected to Parliament in 1868 and 1874. Maxse was active in various causes including the Charity Organisation Society, John Stuart Mill's Land Tenure Reform Association, the National Education League and the Eastern Question Association, founded to campaign against the atrocities of the Ottoman Empire during the Bulgarian April Uprising of 1876. He also founded the Electoral Reform Association which campaigned for the equalisation of parliamentary constituencies.

He died in London.

== Works ==
Maxse was a friend of Joseph Chamberlain, and his 1873 pamphlet The Causes of Social Revolt became the basis of Chamberlain's radical programme of 1885.

== Family ==
Maxse married Cecilia Steel, a society beauty, and daughter of Colonel James Steel. They had two sons and two daughters before separating around 1877:

- Gen. Sir Ivor Maxse (1862–1958), British Army officer of the First World War
- Leopold Maxse (1864–1932), editor
- Olive Hermione Maxse (1867–1955), died unmarried; was a model for Edward Burne-Jones
- Violet Georgina (1872–1958), editor; married, firstly, Lord Edward Cecil and secondly, Alfred Milner, 1st Viscount Milner

== Sources ==
- Rigg, James McMullen (1901). "Maxse, Frederick Augustus" . In Lee, Sidney (ed.). Dictionary of National Biography (1st supplement). London: Smith, Elder & Co.
