= Ivor Maxse =

British Army general (1862–1958)

General Sir Ivor Maxse KCB CVO DSO DL
- Born: Frederick Ivor Maxse; 22 December 1862; London, England
- Died: 28 January 1958 (aged 95); Midhurst, Sussex, England
- Military career
- Allegiance: United Kingdom
- Branch: British Army
- Service years: 1882–1926
- Rank: General
- Units: Royal Fusiliers; Coldstream Guards
- Commands: 1st Battalion, Coldstream Guards; 1st (Guards) Brigade; 18th (Eastern) Division; XVIII Corps; IX Corps; Northern Command
- Conflicts: Mahdist War; Battle of Atbara; Battle of Omdurman; Battle of Umm Diwaykarat; Second Boer War; World War I; Battle of the Somme; Battle of Passchendaele; German Spring Offensive
- Awards: Knight Commander of the Order of the Bath; Commander of the Royal Victorian Order; Distinguished Service Order; Mentioned in Dispatches
- Education: Rugby School
- Alma mater: Royal Military College, Sandhurst
- Spouse: Mary Caroline Wyndham (m. 1899)
- Children: 3
- Parents: Frederick Maxse (father); Cecilia Steel (mother)
- Relatives: Violet Maxse (sister); Leopold Maxse (brother); Henry Berkeley Fitzhardinge Maxse (uncle); Henry Wyndham (father-in-law)

General Sir Frederick Ivor Maxse KCB CVO DSO DL (22 December 1862 – 28 January 1958) was a senior British Army officer who fought during the First World War, best known for his innovative and effective training methods.

== Early life ==
Ivor Maxse was the eldest of four children born to Admiral Frederick Maxse and Cecilia Steel. His siblings were Olive Hermione Maxse, and editors Violet Milner, Viscountess Milner, and Leopold Maxse. His maternal grandmother was Lady Caroline FitzHardinge, daughter of Frederick Berkeley, 5th Earl of Berkeley. He was a nephew of Sir Henry Maxse.

He was educated at Mr. Lake's Preparatory School in Caterham, Surrey from 1875 to 1877; Rugby School from 1877 to 1880 and the Royal Military College, Sandhurst from 1881 to 1882.

== Early military career ==
Maxse was commissioned as a subaltern, with the rank of lieutenant, into the Royal Fusiliers in September 1882. He served with the 2nd Battalion of his regiment in India for the first few years of his military career. He was promoted to captain in October 1889.

He transferred to the Coldstream Guards in May 1891. He was promoted in December 1897 to major and served in the Egyptian Army where he was present at the Battle of Atbara and the Battle of Omdurman. In November 1899 he was in command of the 13th Sudanese Battalion during the operations leading to the defeat of the Khalifa at the Battle of Umm Diwaykarat, and received a mention in despatches 25 November 1899. In recognition of his service in the Sudan, he also received a brevet promotion to lieutenant colonel, on 14 March 1900.

Maxse then served in the Second Boer War (1899-1901), in the rank of lieutenant colonel, as a staff officer in the transport department in South Africa.

Promoted to substantive lieutenant colonel in November 1903, he succeeded Arthur Henniker-Major as commanding officer (CO) of the 1st Battalion of the Coldstream Guards, commanding it from 1903 to 1907. He was promoted to brevet colonel in January 1905. On 11 March 1907 he was promoted to colonel and succeeded Alfred Codrington in command of the Coldstream Guards' regiment and regimental district.

In August 1910 he was promoted to the temporary rank of brigadier general and took command of the 1st (Guards) Brigade from Brigadier General Francis Davies.

== Family life ==
In 1899 Maxse married Mary Caroline Wyndham, daughter of Henry Wyndham, 2nd Baron Leconfield of Petworth House, West Sussex. The couple had three children: John, Frederick and Violet.

== First World War ==
=== Division commander ===
In the First World War, Maxse served initially as commander of his brigade in the opening weeks of the war, leading it in the retreat from Mons to Paris, and later in the battles of the Marne and Aisne. He served in this role until being recalled to the United Kingdom to take over the new 18th (Eastern) Division, being promoted to major general in late August, after having handed over his brigade to Brigadier General Charles FitzClarence in late September.

He led the 18th Division from 2 October and then during its first few months of training in England before it was sent to the Western Front in July 1915, after having been inspected by King George V late the previous month, but both he and his division did not find themselves engaged in any major combat that year.

Under Maxse's command, the 18th Division took all its objectives on the first day of the Battle of the Somme in July 1916. He achieved this in part by hiding the division in no man's land before the battle was joined and having them closely follow the creeping barrage towards the German line. They were "probably the best fighting division possessed by the British Army in September 1916", recruited from volunteers from London and the south-east.

=== Corps commander ===
In January 1917, Maxse, made a Knight Commander of the Order of the Bath, "so that he now became Sir Ivor", was promoted to temporary lieutenant-general and given command of XVIII Corps, which he commanded during the Battle of Passchendaele later in the year.

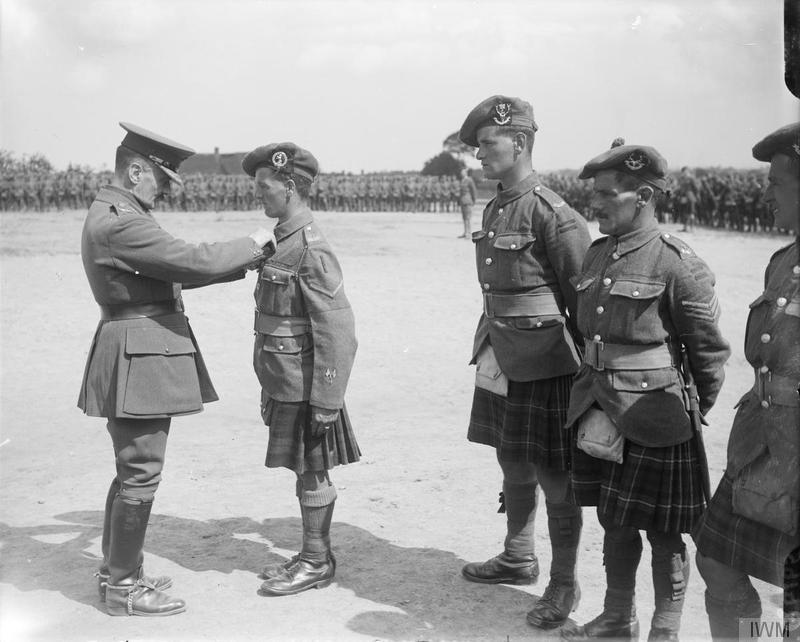
Lieutenant General Maxse, GOC XVIII Corps, presenting medals to men of the Seaforth Highlanders, 152nd (1st Highland) Brigade, 51st (Highland) Division, at St. Jans-Ter-Brizen, France, 21 August 1917.

Maxse's XVIII Corps also took part in Fifth Army's defence against the German Spring Offensive, beginning on 21 March 1918. At 10.45am on 22 March General Sir Hubert Gough, GOC Fifth Army, issued written orders to corps commanders to retreat, if heavily attacked, to the forward line ("the Green Line" in front of the Somme – in practice little more than a line of signposts and wire) of the Rear Zone. Fifth Army staff also informed corps commanders of the impending French reinforcement and Gough's hopes to withdraw III Corps to form a reserve. On receiving these messages at around noon, Maxse ordered XVIII Corps to withdraw immediately, without cover of artillery fire, and they fell back behind the Somme altogether that evening. Gough attempted to halt Maxse's withdrawal when he heard of it, but it was too late. Herbert Watts XIX Corps on Maxse's left also had to fall back.

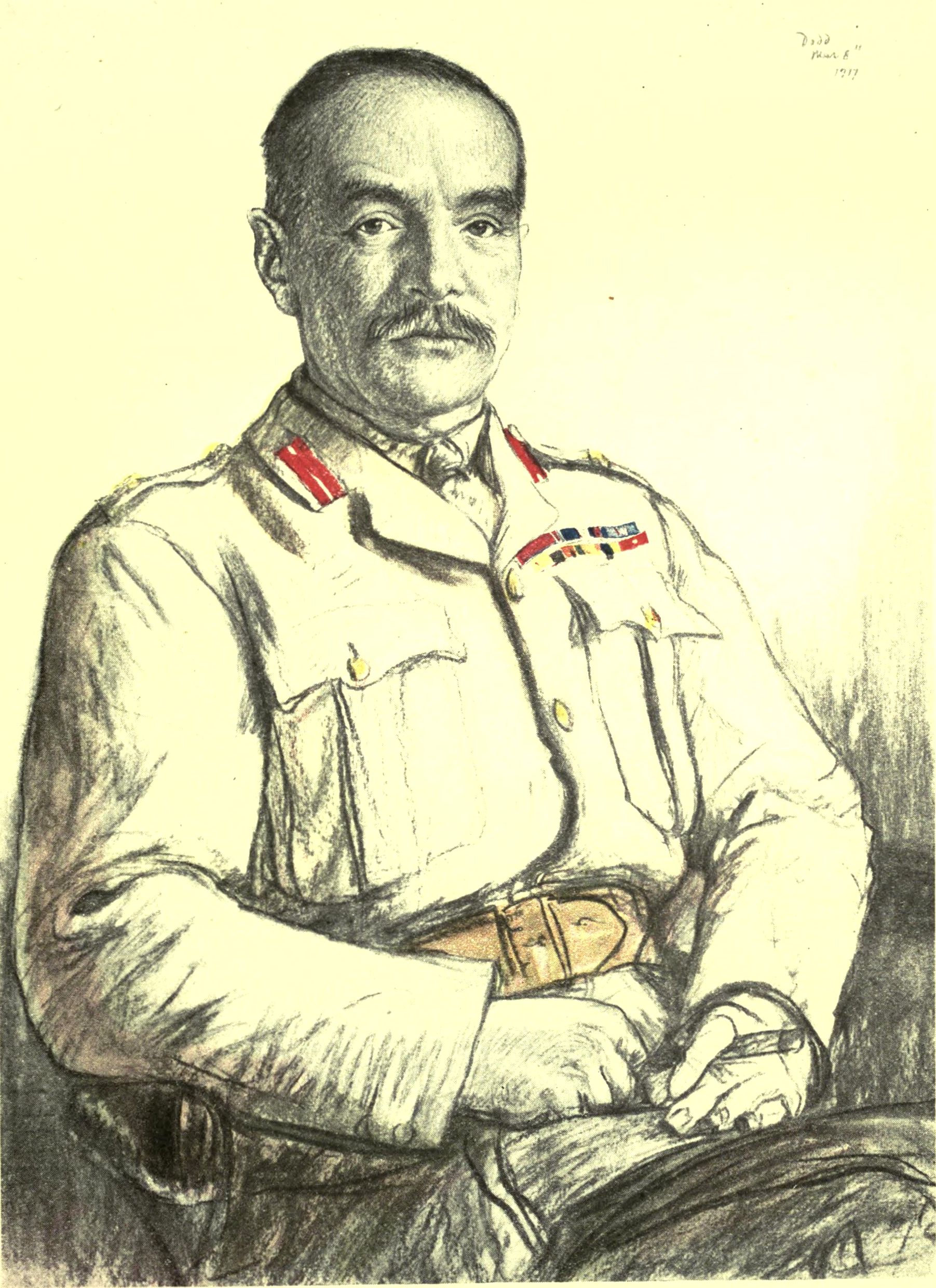
A half length portrait of Maxse.

By 24 March reinforcements – Félix Robillot's II French Cavalry Corps (whose formations were in fact mainly infantry) – were beginning to take their place in Maxse's line. Maxse was able to hold on with the help of a counterattack by "Harman's Detachment": remnants of 2nd and 3rd Cavalry Divisions, 600 assorted infantry under a Royal Horse Artillery Officer and 8 Lewis gun detachments from a Royal Engineer balloon Company.

Fifth Army planned a counterattack by four British brigades and 22nd French Division against a bridgehead which the Germans had made over the Somme at Pargny (threatening a breach between Watts' and Maxse's Corps). The planned counterattack did not take place as General Robillot refused to cooperate, despite a personal visit from Maxse on the morning of 25 March.

On 26 March Maxse was maintaining his place in the line, despite pressure from the French to join them in retreating south-westwards. A messenger, Paul Maze, had to be sent to the headquarters of the French General Georges Louis Humbert, with orders to get back XVIII Corps artillery which had been lent temporarily to the French, with orders not to leave until he had obtained written orders for its return.

=== Inspector General of Training ===
Maxse's speciality was training and he was moved from field command in June 1918, to become Inspector General of Training to the British Armies in France and the UK, to impose uniformity of training in preparing men for the combination of assault and open warfare that was to characterise the Hundred Days Offensive. Douglas Haig had him to dinner at the start of his appointment. Amongst other reforms, in September he increased the size of platoons from 3 sections back to 4 (2 of them equipped with Lewis guns), reversing a decision made in June.

== Later military career ==
At the end of the war Maxse was promoted to the permanent rank of lieutenant-general in January 1919 and became GOC IX Corps, serving as part of the British Army of the Rhine, in Germany.

He went on to be general officer commanding-in-chief (GOC-in-C) of Northern Command from June 1919, when he took over from General John Maxwell, until 1923. Promoted in September 1923 to general, he retired from the army in November 1926. He ceased to belong to the reserve of officers in December 1929.

He held the post of colonel of the Middlesex Regiment from 1921 to 1932.

=== Views on the Germans ===
During the negotiations for an armistice with Germany, Maxse claimed in a letter that:

The Hun is only wishful for peace in order to recover military power and be ready to launch a more successful attack at some opportune moment in the dim future. His heart is by no means altered. That is his nature. Recognise it. It is no use blaming him for his natural temperament, but it is wicked not to recognize what it is. His history during four wars proves it – i.e. 1864, 1866, 1870, 1914 – covering altogether a period of 64 years, two generations! He had but one objective and said so – world power...To prevent it we must crush and humiliate his Army which means his motive...let no sentimental gush be expended on the dirty Hun.

After the war Maxse was still concerned with what he perceived to be the dangerous potential of Germany. Presciently, he wrote in January 1919: "They are incapable of fighting but I am still more convinced that they will quickly recover – say in ten years? And that when they do recover they will be just the same Huns as they have been, with the result that they will revert to militarism which is the only thing they do really understand". Maxse provoked controversy when he gave a speech in November to the annual dinner of the York Gimcrack Club in which he said of the scheme for a League of Nations: "For myself, I don't understand it, and I prefer a League of Tanks to a League of Nations".

== Later life ==
Maxse retired to Sussex, becoming a deputy lieutenant for the county in June 1932, and in 1936 he decided to establish a fruit-growing company, in Little Bognor, Fittleworth, near Petworth: the Maxey Fruit Company. The business thrived and continued even after his death, ending only in 1968.

Maxse suffered a stroke in 1956 and became incapacitated. He moved to a nursing home in Pendean, West Lavington in Sussex, where lived the last two years of his life. He died in 1958: described as an "atheist", he was nevertheless buried at St Mary's Church, Fittleworth, West Sussex.

== Legacy ==
In his memoirs, Basil Liddell Hart described Maxse as:

...short and dark, with a sallow complexion, small deep-set eyes, and a long drooping moustache, which gave him the look of a Tartar chief—all the more because the descriptive term 'a Tartar' so aptly fitted his manner in dealing with lazy or inefficient seniors and subordinates. … Maxse seized the salient points of any idea with lightning quickness, although occasionally misjudging some point because of too hasty examination. His fierce manner concealed a very warm heart, and he particularly liked people who showed that they were not afraid of him. He was always ready to encourage and make use of new ideas.

The military historian Correlli Barnett said Maxse was "One of the ablest officers of his generation, a man of originality and drive, and a formidable personality".

== Notes ==
Military offices
Preceded by Sir Lawrence Parsons	GOC 18th (Eastern) Division; 1914–1917	Succeeded by Richard Phillips Lee
Preceded by New post	GOC XVIII Corps; 1917–1918	Succeeded by Sir Aylmer Hunter-Weston
Preceded by Sir John Maxwell	GOC-in-C Northern Command; 1919–1923	Succeeded by Sir Charles Harington
