= Black Monday (1894) =

Economic crisis in Newfoundland

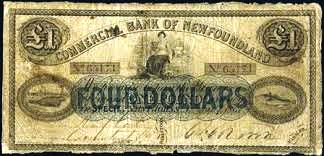

The Newfoundland Bank Crash of 1894, known as Black Monday, was one of the turning points in Newfoundland's pre-Confederation history.

The financial woes of the former British colony were worsened when two of the colony's commercial banks, the Union Bank of Newfoundland (established in 1854) and the Commercial Bank of Newfoundland (established in 1858), both located in St. John's, closed their doors to the public on December 10, 1894.

Fish merchants sat on the boards of directors of both banks and had approved large and risky loans to themselves, which left the banks with dangerously-low cash reserves leading into the crash.

London banks suspended credit to the Commercial Bank of Newfoundland and requested payment on some of its loans. It was unable to meet these demands and was forced to close two days later. A bank run ensued on both the Union and the Savings Banks. The government-run Savings bank was able to weather the storm, but the Union was forced to close that day, never to reopen.

== Aftermath ==
The crash had a disastrous effect on commerce and employment in the colony. Many families were left destitute. The crash brought Newfoundland to the brink of bankruptcy and resulted in the Canada Newfoundland Confederation talks. It also highlighted the weakness of its economy and the truck credit system on which it depended.

Over a million dollars in bank notes from both the Commercial and Union banks were rendered worthless, at least temporarily. Savings accounts suddenly decreased in value and the country was in danger of defaulting in its public debt.

The banks' directors, including Premier Augustus F. Goodridge, were arrested and charged with larceny and conspiracy (they were all acquitted in 1897). Unemployed workers held street demonstrations demanding food and jobs. The government faced growing instability and went through three prime ministers in two months.

Canadian banks began arriving within two weeks of the crash: the Bank of Nova Scotia, the Bank of Montreal, the Canadian Bank of Commerce, and the Merchant's Bank of Halifax (now the Royal Bank of Canada). The Bank of Montreal accepted the government's account in early 1895, and the country adopted Canadian currency in January of that year. It was the beginning of heavy involvement by Canadian banks in the Newfoundland economy, which was an important factor in Newfoundland eventually joining Confederation in 1949.
