= Philip Kerr, 11th Marquess of Lothian =

British politician, diplomat and editor of various publications (1882–1940)

The Most Honourable The Marquess of Lothian KT CH PC DL
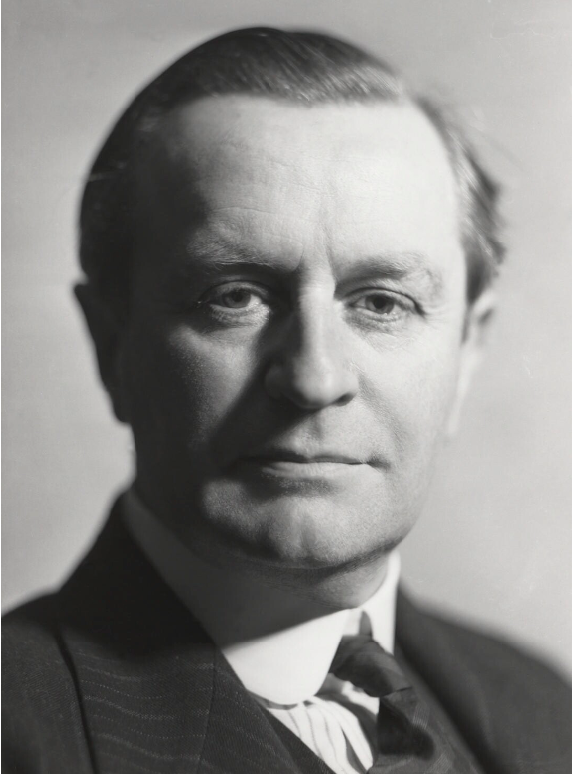
- Lothian in 1935

British Ambassador to the United States
- In office 1 September 1939 – 12 December 1940
- Monarch: George VI
- Prime Minister: Neville Chamberlain; Winston Churchill
- Preceded by: Sir Ronald Lindsay
- Succeeded by: The Viscount Halifax

Chancellor of the Duchy of Lancaster
- In office 25 August 1931 – 10 November 1931
- Monarch: George V
- Prime Minister: Ramsay MacDonald
- Preceded by: The Lord Ponsonby
- Succeeded by: J. C. C. Davidson

Personal details
- Born: 18 April 1882 London, England, United Kingdom
- Died: 12 December 1940 (aged 58) Washington, D.C., U.S.
- Party: Liberal
- Education: New College, Oxford

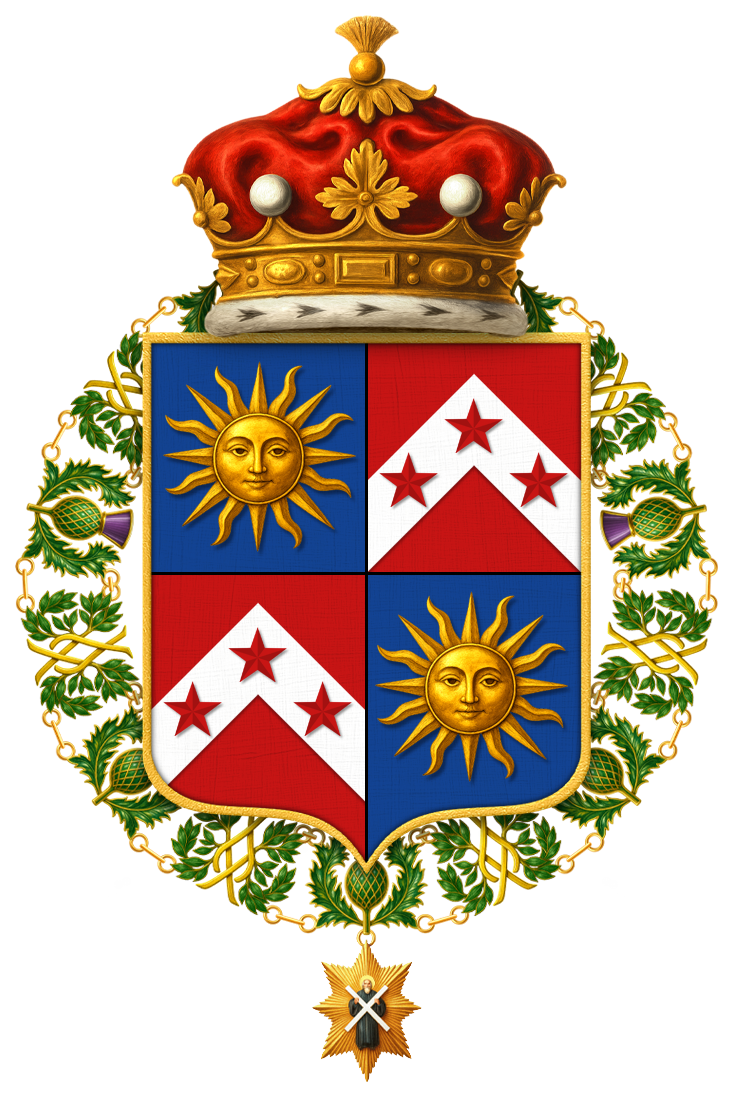
Shield of Arms of Philip Henry Kerr, 11th Marquess of Lothian, KT, CH, PC, DL

Philip Henry Kerr, 11th Marquess of Lothian, KT, CH, PC, DL (18 April 1882 – 12 December 1940) was a British politician, British Ambassador to the United States and editor of various journals. He was private secretary to Prime Minister David Lloyd George between 1916 and 1921 and as such played a major role in the Paris Peace Conference (1919–1920). After succeeding a cousin in the marquessate in 1930, he held junior ministerial offices in the Lords from 1931 in the National Government, headed by Ramsay MacDonald, until he resigned from it in 1932.

In the 1930s, Lothian promoted entente with Germany, and was considered by critics as a leading advocate of appeasement of Germany but his role was more complex than that. He felt the harshness of the ultimate German reparations in the Treaty of Versailles had been a great mistake. He also emphasised the dangers of Stalin's communism. He changed his mind about Hitler's intentions after reading an English translation of Mein Kampf. He then felt war was inevitable and it was vital that Britain speed up re-armament as their armed forces were no match for Hitler's at the time.

From 1939 to his death, he was Ambassador to the United States. As such he probably did more than any individual, other than the British prime minister Winston Churchill, to get a neutral United States finally involved in the Second World War and he proved highly successful in winning America's support for the British war effort, especially the Lend-Lease Act, which passed Congress after his death.

On Lothian's death, Churchill described him as "our greatest ambassador to the United States".

== Background and education ==
Kerr was born in London as the eldest son of Major-General Lord Ralph Kerr, who was the third son of John Kerr, 7th Marquess of Lothian. He was the grandson of Duke of Norfolk, the lay head of the Catholic Church in Britain, through his mother Lady Anne Fitzalan-Howard, the daughter of Henry Fitzalan-Howard, 14th Duke of Norfolk, by the Honourable Augusta Mary Minna Catherine Lyons, the daughter of Vice-Admiral Edmund Lyons, 1st Baron Lyons.

Kerr was a nephew of Edmund FitzAlan-Howard, 1st Viscount FitzAlan of Derwent, and a great-nephew of Richard Lyons, 1st Viscount Lyons. Via his descent from the Lyons family, Kerr was a relative of Maine Swete Osmond Walrond (1870–1927), who was the Private Secretary to Lord Milner and a fellow member of Milner's Kindergarten.

Kerr was educated at The Oratory School, Birmingham, Cardinal Newman's foundation, from 1892 to 1900, and at New College, Oxford, where he took a First in Modern History in 1904, subsequent to which, in 1904, he tried unsuccessfully for a Prize Fellowship of All Souls College, Oxford.

The description of Kerr by Sir James Butler, formerly Regius Professor of Modern History at the University of Cambridge as he, his biographer, and his friends knew him was:

Athletic and strikingly good-looking in youth, [Kerr] possessed great charm and great ability, with a keen inquiring mind; informal in manner, unprejudiced and unconventional, courageously determined to follow his own line, he was always, as his friend Lionel Curtis put it, breaking new ground. Though not easy to know intimately, owing to an ingrained detachment and elusiveness, he was remarkable for his unselfish kindness and his loyalty in friendship. Whether in his early years as a Catholic or later years as a Christian Scientist he impressed all who knew him by his deeply religious outlook and the spirituality of his character.

Kerr was noted for an informal personal style that contrasted with his aristocratic background. His interest in democratic principles was evidenced by his expressed admiration for American political models. This perspective contributed to his reputation as an aristocrat who maintained engagement across different social strata.

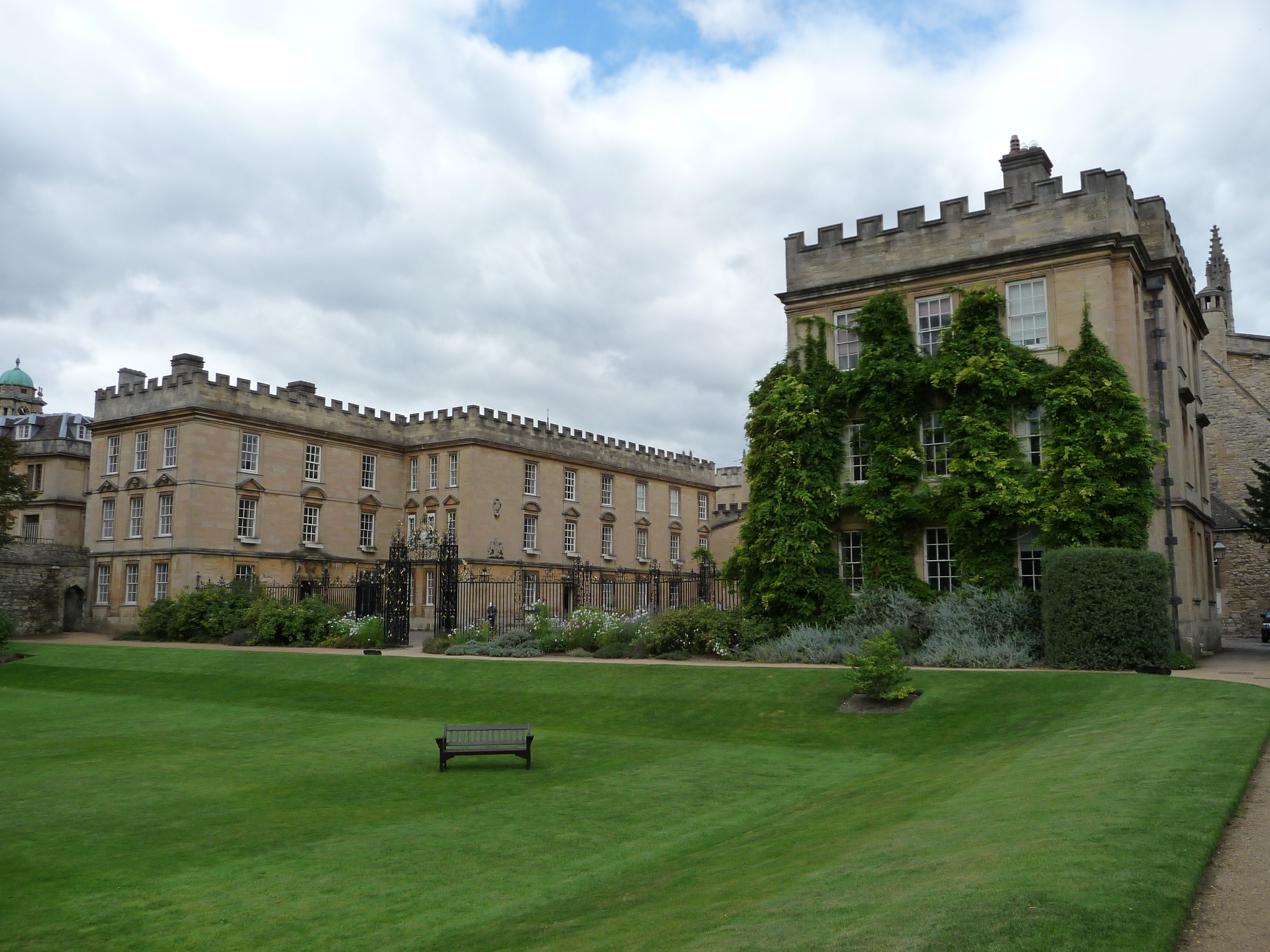
New College, Oxford

The historian Michael Bloch, writes in his 2015 book that Kerr (as he then was) was known for his handsome, androgynous looks and that ' Lothian was derisively nicknamed ' Narcissus ' by his enemies. ' [Perhaps a witticism on his well known untidiness of dress and grooming?] Bloch writes that although admiring of and admired by women, he speculates that he had no desire to marry or make love to them and he adds him to others he assumed to be repressed homosexuals. Bloch provides no sources for these conjectures in the four pages in his book that mention Lothian, other than an unpublished memoir by Lothian's secretary on a different matter regarding the importance to Lothian of his religion. Bloch wrote that it was very unlikely that the deeply religious Kerr ever engaged in homosexual relationships, but noted that he never married. Lord Brand, who was married to Phyllis Langhorne, Nancy Astor's sister, and a longtime friend and associate of Kerr since their Oxford University days wrote 'Most women fall in love with him sooner or later, as far as my experience goes'. Kerr's secretary at Blickling Muriel O'Sullivan wrote of Kerr "He did not seem dependent on the companionship of men in the way that the society of women seemed essential to his well-being."

Winston Churchill wrote of Lothian:

In all the years I had known him he had given me the impression of high intellectual and aristocratic detachment from vulgar affairs. Airy, viewy, aloof, dignified, censorious, yet in a light and gay manner, he had always been good company.

== South Africa and Milner's Kindergarten ==
Kerr served in the South African government from 1905 to 1910 and was a member of what became called "Milner's Kindergarten", a group of colonial officers who deemed themselves reformist rather than an actual political faction. They believed the colonies should have more say in the Commonwealth. By the standards of the era, they were liberal: most of them had an interest in elevating the status of white colonials, rejected independence, and had a paternalistic view of nonwhites. Kerr became more liberal on these issues than his counterparts by admiring Gandhi and trying, if not entirely succeeding, to be more progressive than they were on racial issues.

Kerr was based in Johannesburg, where he served on the Inter-Colonial Council where he specialised in the running of the railroads. Kerr helped write the Selborne Memorandum of 1907 calling for the four colonies of the Transvaal, the Orange River Colony, Natal and the Cape Colony to be united into one and granted Dominion status as the new country of South Africa. In common with the other members of the Milner's Kindergarten, Kerr rejected the original British plan for the cultural genocide of the Afrikaners by forcing them to speak English regardless if they wanted to or not.

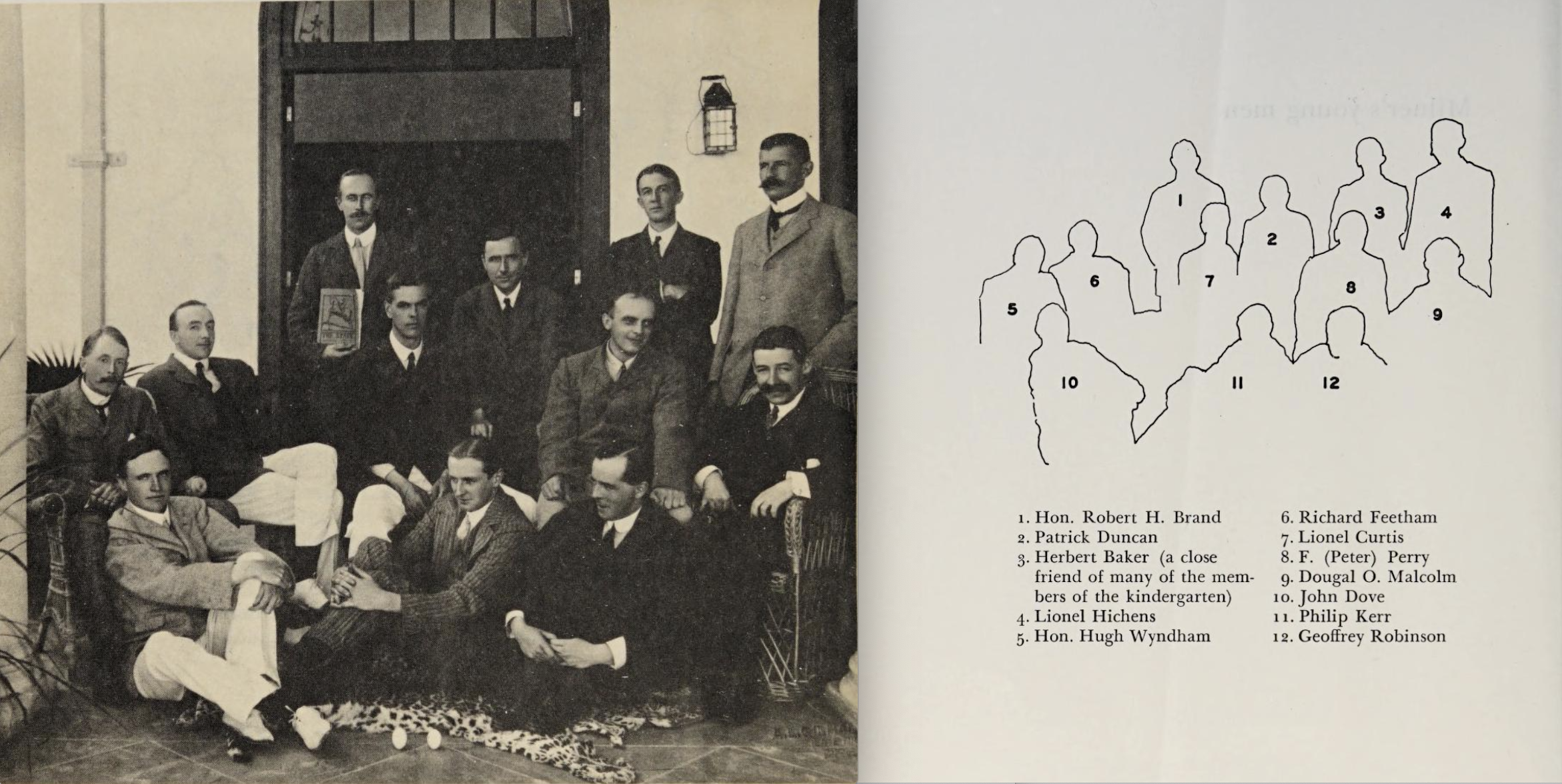
Milner's Kindergarten, 1902

Instead, he advocated reconciliation with the moderate Afrikaner nationalists led by Jan Smuts and Louis Botha. Kerr envisioned the new nation of South Africa as a federation where the Anglos (South African whites of British descent) would share power with the Afrikaners. The black and Asian populations of South Africa were completely excluded from the political progress-the moderate Afrikaner nationalists were prepared to allow "coloureds" (the South African term for mixed race people) the right to vote, a concession opposed by the more extreme Afrikaner nationalists. Inspired by The Federalist Papers that led to the modern American constitution, Kerr founded in December 1908 a journal called The States that was published in both English and Afrikaans that urged for the federation of the four colonies and Dominion status. Kerr defined the purpose of The States as allowing "...for the South Africans to join in a state and became a nation". However, the Afrikaners would not accept a federation and instead preferred a unitary state as the greater number of Afrikaners vs. the Anglos would ensure the former would dominate South Africa rather than the latter. On 31 May 1910, the Cape Colony, Natal, the Orange River Colony and the Transvaal were merged into the new nation of South Africa, which was granted Dominion status.

== The Round Table ==
In September 1909, Kerr took part in the conference at Plas Newydd that led to the Round Table movement. He returned to England in 1910 to found and edit the Round Table Journal , which he continued to edit until 1916 and thereafter remained on its Moot (editorial board). It became a highly influential international quarterly during the inter-war years. After Lothian inherited Blickling Hall in Norfolk in 1930, the members of the Moot would often meet as his guests there with their wives for a few days or a weekend to agree on the editorial content.

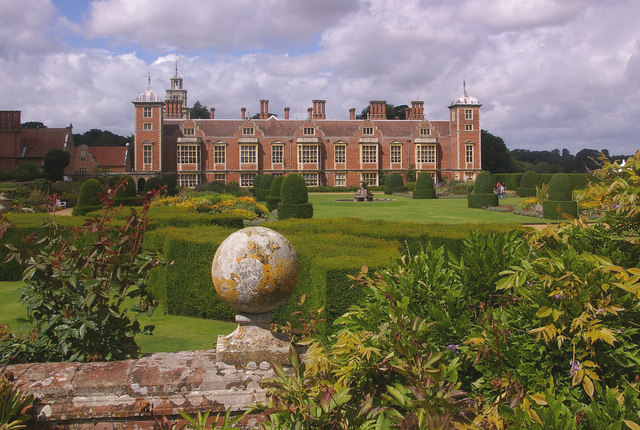
Blickling Hall east facade

At a meeting in London in January 1910, Kerr called for "an organic union to be brought about by the establishment of an imperial government constitutionally responsible to all the electors of the Empire, and with the power to act directly on individual citizens". In November 1910, after Kerr became the first editor of The Round Table Journal, it attracted much attention with its plans to turn the empire into an imperial federation. In his article After Four Months of War that appeared in the December 1914 edition of The Round Table, Kerr called for "the voluntary federation of all free civilised states" as the best way to end war forever. In September 1915 edition of The Round Table in an article entitled The End of War, Kerr again called for a "world state" that would be "a responsible and representative political authority" for the entire world as the best way to end the war.

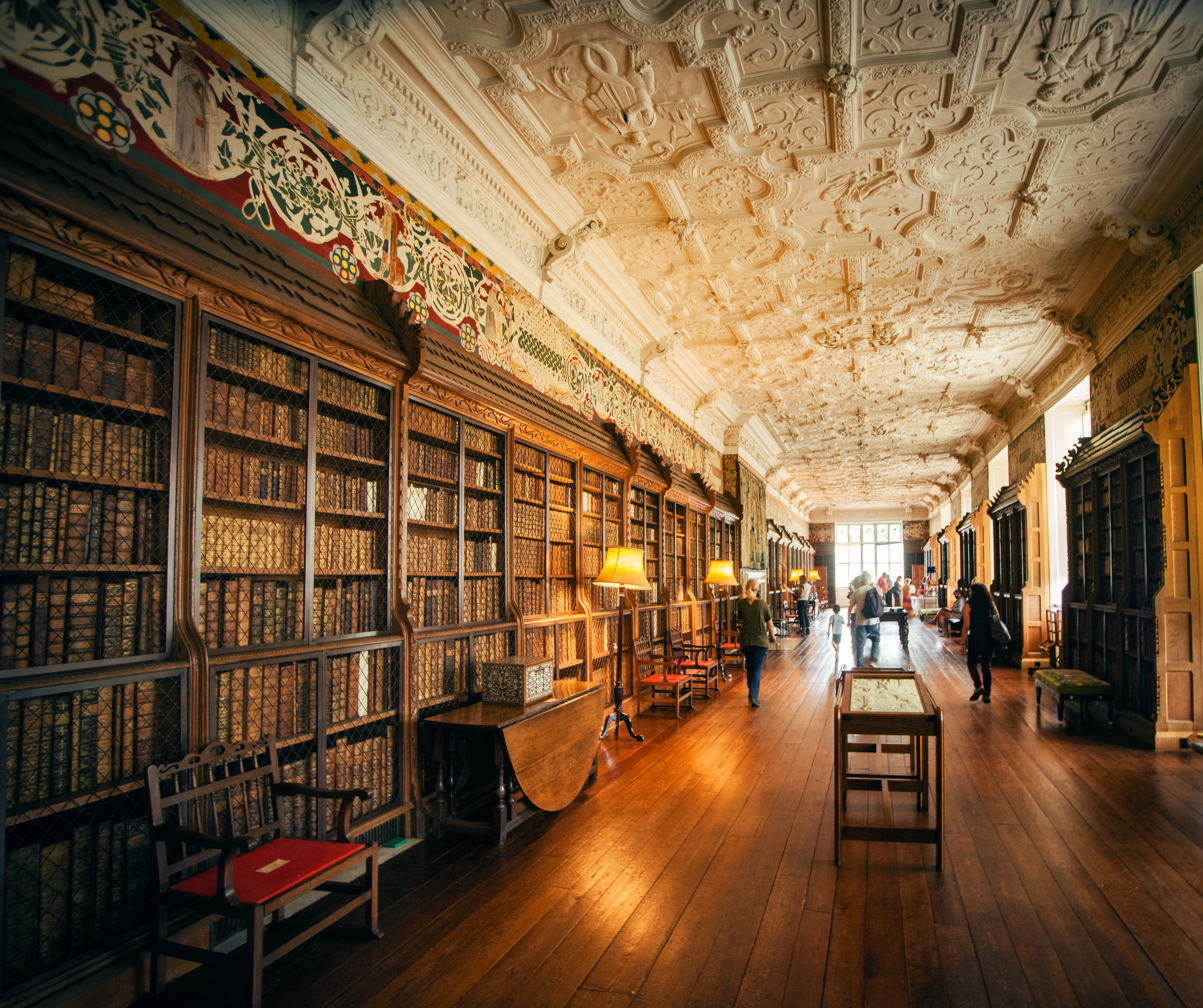
Blickling Hall Library in the Long Gallery

In June 1916 edition of The Round Table, Kerr in his article The principle of Peace, Kerr repeated his call for a "world state", saying the present international condition was "like that of the Western states of America in the early days...So long as independent behave like independent sovereign individuals, from time to time they will massacre each other in defense of what they believe to be their rights. And they will not cease from doing so until they agree to draw up laws which secure justice for all, to obey those laws themselves, and until the nations of the earth are willing to be united into a World State".

In a June 1933 article in the Round Table Lothian had urged that nations should be on their guard ' for history warns us that dictatorships and brutality and worship of force at home tend in due time express themselves also in foreign affairs. ' For the moment the essential thing was to support the League of Nations and the Peace Pact; but it was desirable to revise the Covenant and the Lucarno treaties ' (these treaties were essentially an attempt to guarantee the European nations' borders as agreed in the Treaty of Versailles).

== Lloyd George's private secretary and the Paris Peace Conference ==
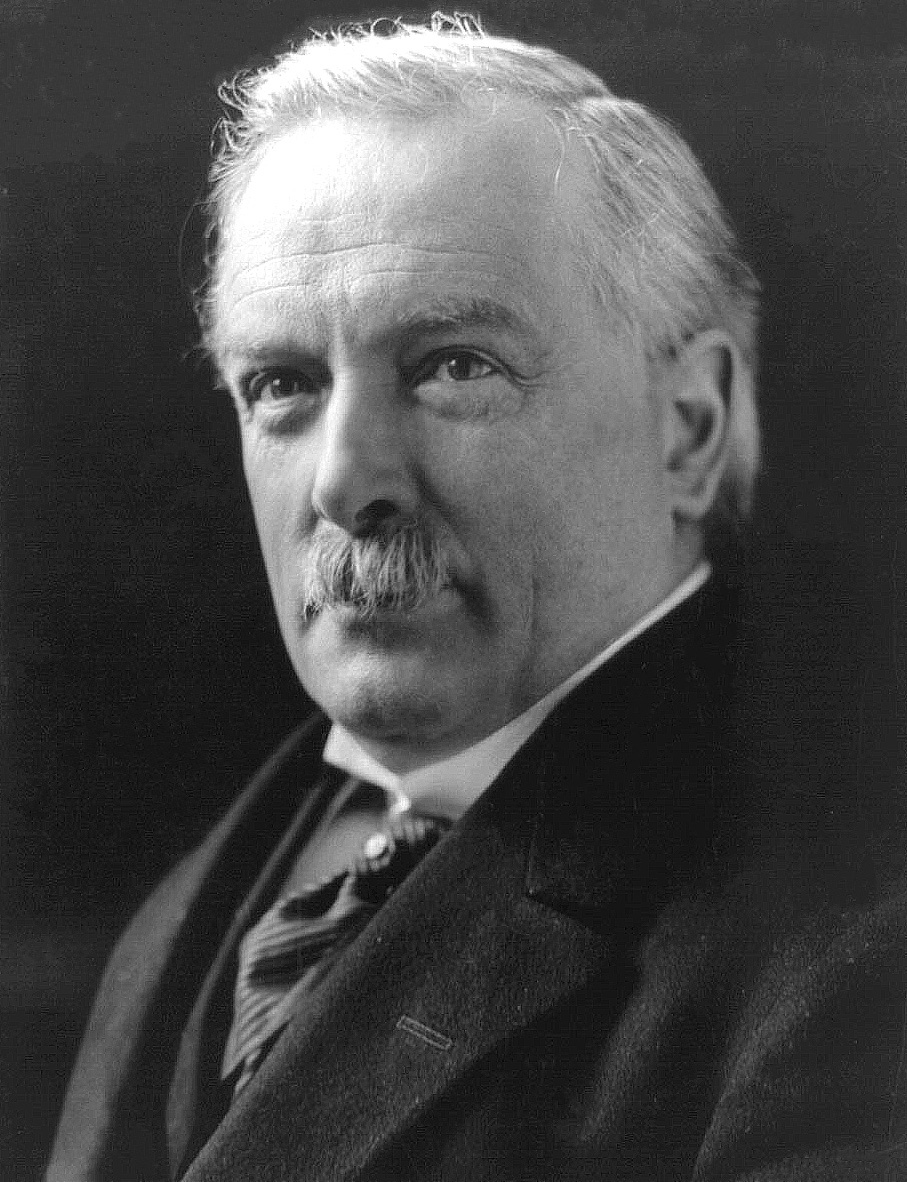
David Lloyd George

In December 1916, Kerr was appointed British prime minister David Lloyd George's private secretary and was active in the Paris Peace Conference. As the right-hand man to Lloyd George, Kerr became well known in his own right. In Paris, Lloyd George ignored the Foreign Office wherever he could and used his own staff of bright young men. The bureaucrats particularly resented his private secretary, the high minded, " religious and arrogant " Philip Kerr. Because Lloyd George hated reading memos, he delegated the task to Kerr, who then discussed whatever information he thought pertinent with the prime minister. Kerr came to be Lloyd George's "gatekeeper", deciding what information was passed on to the prime minister and who was allowed to see him, making him into a man of much power. The professional diplomats muttered among themselves, and Lord Curzon, who had been left behind in London to mind the shop while Balfour, the foreign secretary, and Lloyd George, the prime minister, were in Paris, was pained. The prime minister paid no attention. Lord Curzon referred to Kerr as the "second Foreign Office", Henry Wilson called Kerr a "poisonous" influence on Lloyd George while Maurice Hankey described Kerr as Lloyd George's "watch dog". The historians Michael Dockrill and John Turner wrote:

It is difficult to determine precisely the impact of Kerr's advice on the course of British policy. But from the testimony of contemporaries, from Lloyd George's replies to Kerr's letters, and from the way that Kerr's recommendations found their way into policy documents and decisions, there can be no doubt that the prime minister listened carefully to Kerr's suggestions.

Kerr played a prominent role in the reparations demands on Germany. Initially, it was agreed that reparations would only go for direct war damages, which would have ensured the majority of reparations would go to France as most of northern France had turned into a wasteland. In an attempt to secure more reparations for Britain, Lloyd George demanded that German reparations also go to paying for all the pensions of the veterans, widows and orphans for the entire British empire, a demand that caused the breakdown on any sort of agreement on reparations. The draft version of the Treaty of Versailles, which Kerr drafted, spoke of compensation for German "invasions"; Kerr had the final version speak of German "aggression" as part of the British bid to secure more reparations at the expense of France.

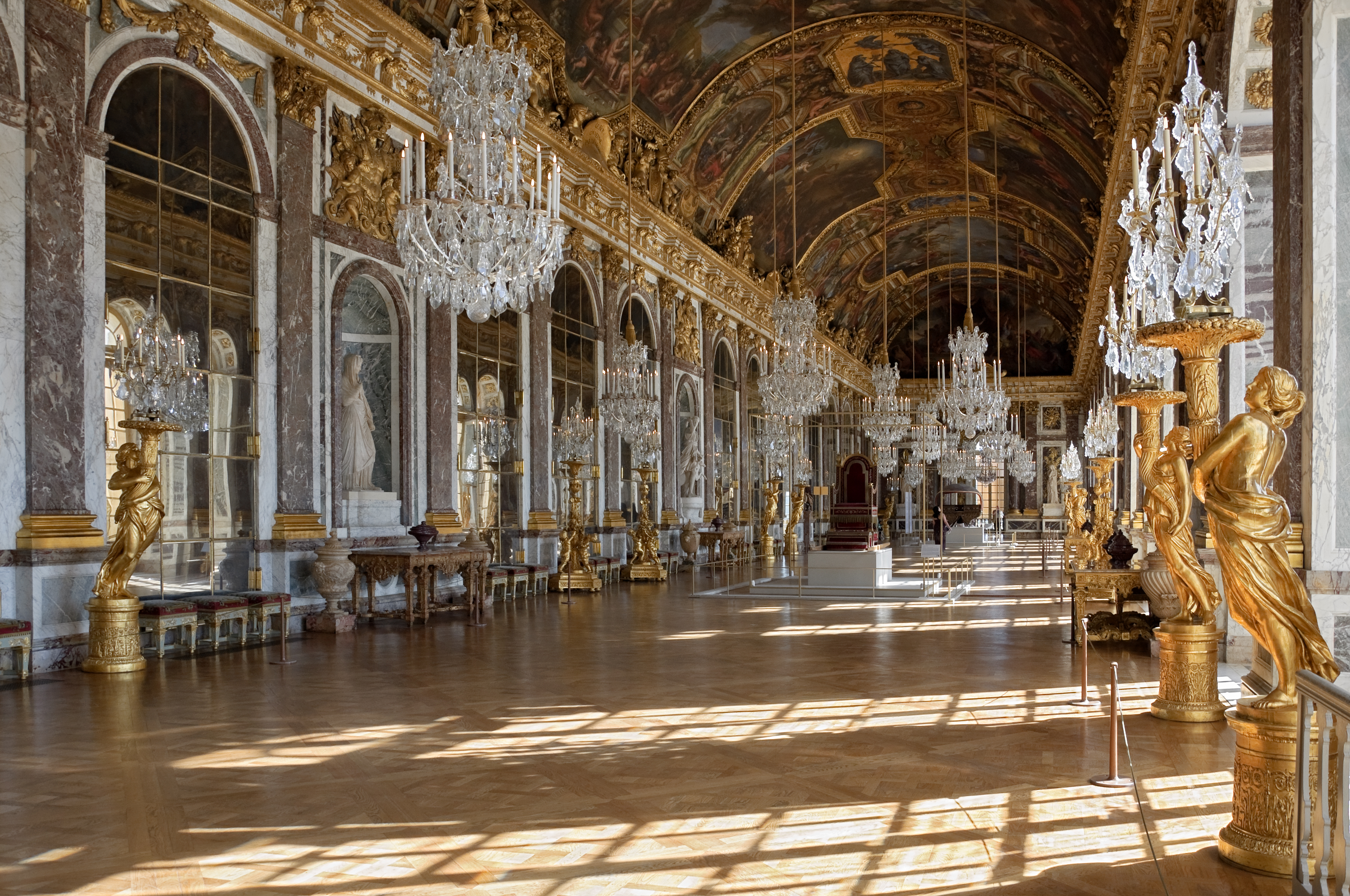
The Hall of Mirrors in Palace of Versailles where the Peace Conference delegates met

On 18 February 1919, Kerr advised Lloyd George that the only way to persuade the French to drop their demand for severing the Rhineland from Germany would be for an Anglo-American commitment to defend France against renewed German aggression. Kerr was very strongly opposed to the French plans to separate the Rhineland from the Reich as "unreasonable", writing in a letter to Lloyd George on 3 March 1919 he favoured peace "terms which gave the German people some hope and some independence". Ultimately, the French accepted the Rhineland would remain part of Germany in exchange for keeping the Rhineland demilitarised, under Allied occupation for 15 years (though the occupation actually ended in 1930) and a military alliance with Britain and the United States. However, the American Senate failed to ratify the alliance, which became moot as a result. Besides for the Rhineland issue, Kerr was highly concerned that the United States would not join the League of Nations as several senators felt the covenant of the league would threaten American sovereignty. To ensure the American Senate would vote to join the League of Nations, Kerr favoured changing the covenant to address the concerns of the Senate, advice that was not followed and led to the Senate rejecting joining the League.

In March 1919, the proclamation of the Hungarian Soviet Republic led by Bela Kun in response to the Vix Note shocked the British delegation, which became very concerned that harsh peace terms might lead to the German Communists taking power. The British delegation saw Soviet Russia as its principal concern, which governed their attitude towards Germany. Lloyd George retired for a weekend to the Hotel d'Angleterre in the Paris suburb of Fontainebleau together with Kerr and his closest advisers to discuss what peace terms should be sought with the main fear being of driving Germany towards Soviet Russia. In March 1919, Kerr was then the man who wrote the Fontainebleau Memorandum setting out more moderate British goals at the peace conference.

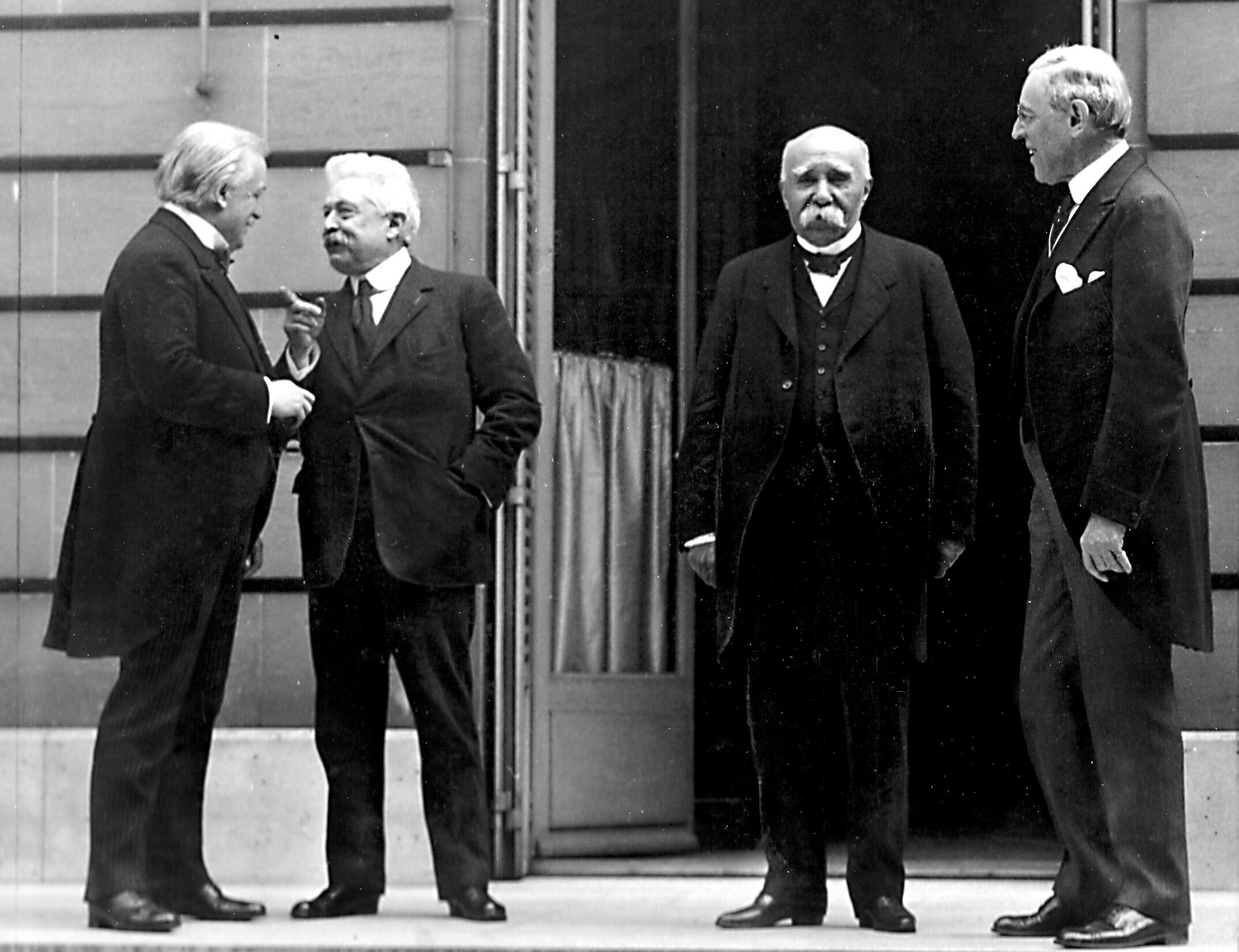
"The Big Four" made the major decisions at the Paris Peace Conference (from left to right, David Lloyd George of Britain, Vittorio Emanuele Orlando of Italy, Georges Clemenceau of France, and Woodrow Wilson of the United States).

Kerr always regretted that the amount of war reparations that were imposed on Germany after the Great War had not been more generously set during the Paris Peace conference itself in 1919 when he and the world leaders were still there. Their severity was left to be decided afterwards by a separate international commission. The onerousness of these terms, which he thought was a great mistake when they were finally set, combined with the loss of German territories under the Peace settlement, gave rise to a festering resentment in Germany. Hitler was able to exploit this to the hilt in his rise to power.

At the Paris peace conference, Kerr befriended and got to know many delegates. He developed lasting friendships and influence with most of the world leaders; not just British; going back to Woodrow Wilson, Georges Clemenceau and Jan Smuts and many of the other delegates. One in particular a member of the American delegation, the Assistant Navy Secretary and a rising star in the Democratic Party, Franklin D. Roosevelt, later became an important factor in his career when Roosevelt was elected president in 1932.

After the Peace Conference, at the age of thirty-eight, Kerr was appointed a Member of the Order of the Companions of Honour (CH) in March 1920.

== Newspaper Editor ==
In March 1921, Kerr left Lloyd George's service to become the editor of The Daily Chronicle, a newspaper that Lloyd George had purchased in 1918. As editor, Kerr favoured the Liberals in his leaders (editorials).

Kerr was a director of United Newspapers from 1921 to 1922. He was offered the post of foreign editor of The Times in 1923 but turned it down.

In August 1922, Kerr delivered three lectures at the Institute for Politics in Williamstown, Massachusetts entitled On the Prevention of War. In his lectures, Kerr repeated his favourite theme of a world federation as the best way to stop war, saying the division of the world into "absolutely separate sovereign states" was the "mechanical cause" of war. Kerr called for "the rule of law" to replace "the existing reign of violence" in world politics. Starting in 1923, Lothian came to feel that Germany had been "sinned against" with the Treaty of Versailles, and the entire treaty needed to be revised to the save the peace of the world. Kerr's moralism led him to become "obsessed" with the notion of Germany as a victim. On 30 October 1929, in a speech entitled Democracy, nationality and international unity that he delivered in Hamburg at the Institut für Außenpolitik, Kerr declared: "The wartime thesis that one nation was solely responsible for the war is clearly untrue". In the same speech, Kerr claimed the Treaty of Versailles was amoral because it was based on the "lie" that Germany started the war in 1914, which Kerr claimed was the work of many states.

== The Rhodes Trust and Rhodes Scholarships ==
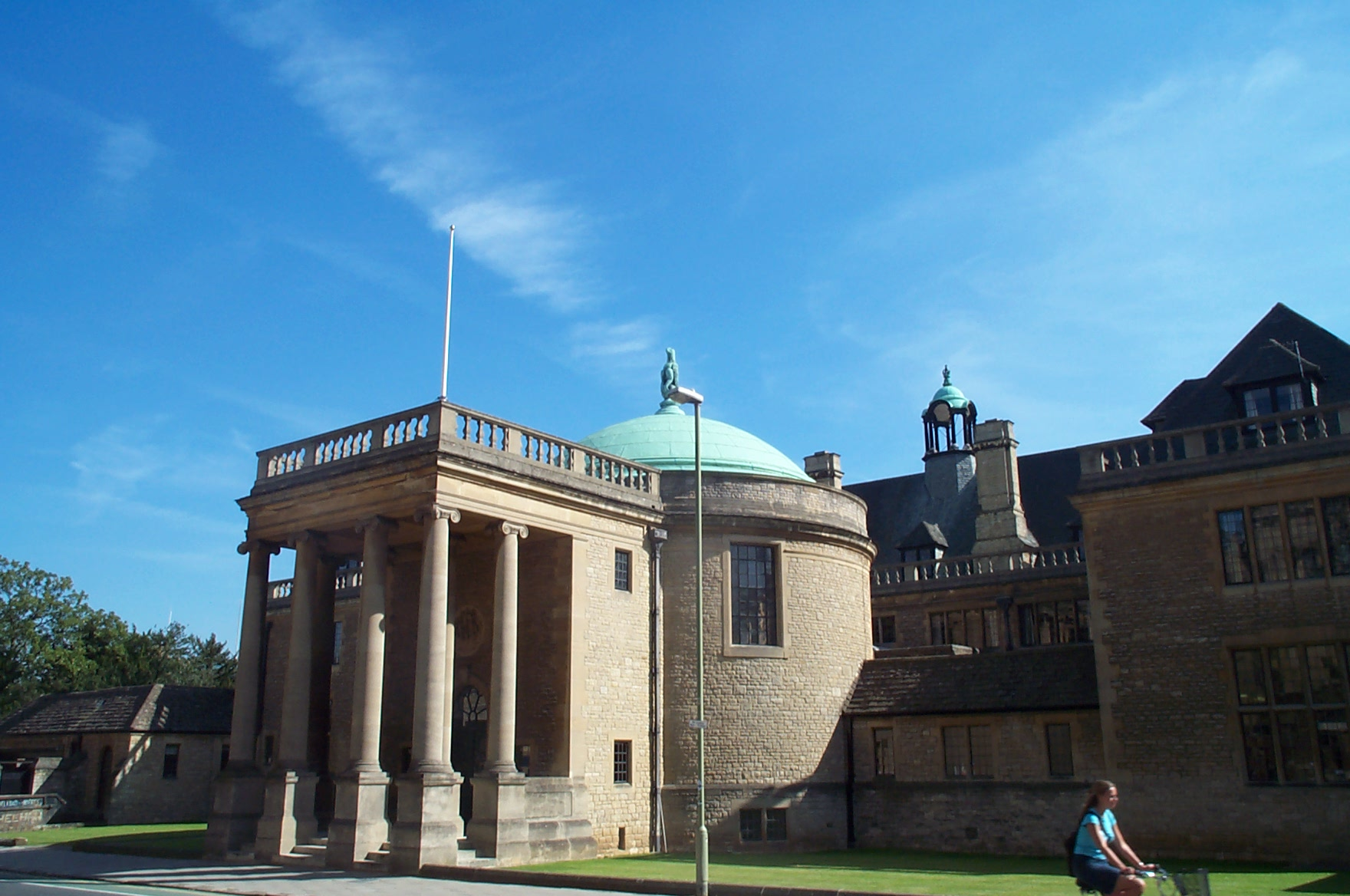
Rhodes House Oxford

In 1925 Kerr was appointed General Secretary of the Rhodes Trust. He admired Rhodes ideal to promote 'the union of the English speaking peoples' to render war impossible and to achieve these purposes by providing a liberal education for young men of promise – and at Oxford – such ends and such means were entirely after the new Secretary's heart. He remained Secretary until his departure for Washington as Ambassador in 1939.As such he travelled widely to the Commonwealth Dominions and United States each year in expanding the Rhodes Scholarships.The added international contact during the fourteen years he headed up the Rhodes Trust from 1925 to 1939 gave him unparalleled familiarity with leading individuals in his travels throughout the world (mostly on behalf of the Rhodes Scholarship scheme and its expansion). The former Rhodes scholars in their own nations were an important source to Lothian and almost all doors were opened to him. This experience resulted in wide international contacts and insight. He therefore got to know all the Commonwealth countries, including Canada, Australia, New Zealand, South Africa and a host of other countries intimately, including the United States as well as India, and therefore had more first-hand knowledge and understanding of them all than almost certainly any man alive at the time. He spent nearly as much time away from Britain as in it for many years (travel then being by ship between continents before the age of air travel).

His colleagues universally praised his Rhodes tenure on his leaving his post on his appointment as British Ambassador in Washington. Sir Carleton Allen, the Oxford Warden of the Rhodes Trust, gave an interesting insight into Lothian. He said of him:

'I have known few men who possessed, besides great charm of character and sympathy, a quicker grasp of essentials. His interests and responsibilities outside the Rhodes Trust, multiplied as time went on...but he was always accessible and he had the gift of concentrating into a few hours work which would have taken most people as many days.'

== Admiration for the United States ==
Lothian held a profound admiration for the democratic foundations upon which the United States was built which had led to a society of opportunity. He felt, like Gladstone opined, that the US Constitution was ‘the most wonderful work ever struck off at a given time by the brain and purpose of man’. Lothian held a particular respect for what he believed the US had done in promoting universal education and the extension of the voting franchise to the world. He also believed that the United States' "individual pioneers," especially those from foreign nations, propelled the nation to greatness. In his mind, the US had practically no external problems and its primary focus was on settling and developing its vast territory, with the class system virtually disappearing in the process over the last century.

Lothian believed that there was a reason Britain had lagged behind in universal education and why Britain had been so much slower than the US to extend the franchise to the whole population. The higher educational system in Britain before the First World War had largely been confined to the possessing classes because of Britain's focus on its overseas territories. These amounted to one quarter of the world at the time. Because of this, British governments had believed that training people for overseas duties was their priority. Also, that the electorate was expected to be educated if it was to come to reasonably sensible judgements about these external problems and the franchise had thus been limited. Basically, this small island's development was all overseas and throughout the British Empire whereas the United States’ great expansion and development had been within its own borders by homesteaders and entrepreneurs. Things began to change in Britain as its wealth and overseas power began to wane. After the First War higher education was extended. Earlier when the political party system took hold, the parties had taken on, in their own interest, the responsibility of educating the electorate on matters of policy. So, the franchise was extended.

== Religion ==
The Kerr family had been brought up in the Roman Catholic Church: his grandmother was a noted convert. Indeed, Kerr's grandfather the Duke of Norfolk was the lay head of the Catholic Church in Britain. Kerr himself considered becoming a priest or monastic at times, but in adulthood he became disillusioned with the faith.

In October 1911, Kerr suffered a nervous breakdown. During a visit to India in 1912, Kerr intensely studied the religions of the sub-continent such as Hinduism, which reflected his increasing disenchantment with Catholicism. Later, after reading the book Science and Health with the Key to the Scriptures, Kerr converted to Christian Science. His close friendship with Nancy Astor who was a convert to the Christian Science helped lead to his subsequent conversion and then lifelong adherence to Christian Science in 1923.

Kerr had contradictory impulses, combining what he considered to be a "rational" approach to politics with a strong reverence for science together with a mystical, transcendent side of his personality that longed for something spiritual; the religion of Christian Science allowed him to combine his mysticism and belief in the supernatural together with his rationality and belief in science.

== Succeeded as the Marquess of Lothian and appointed to government offices ==
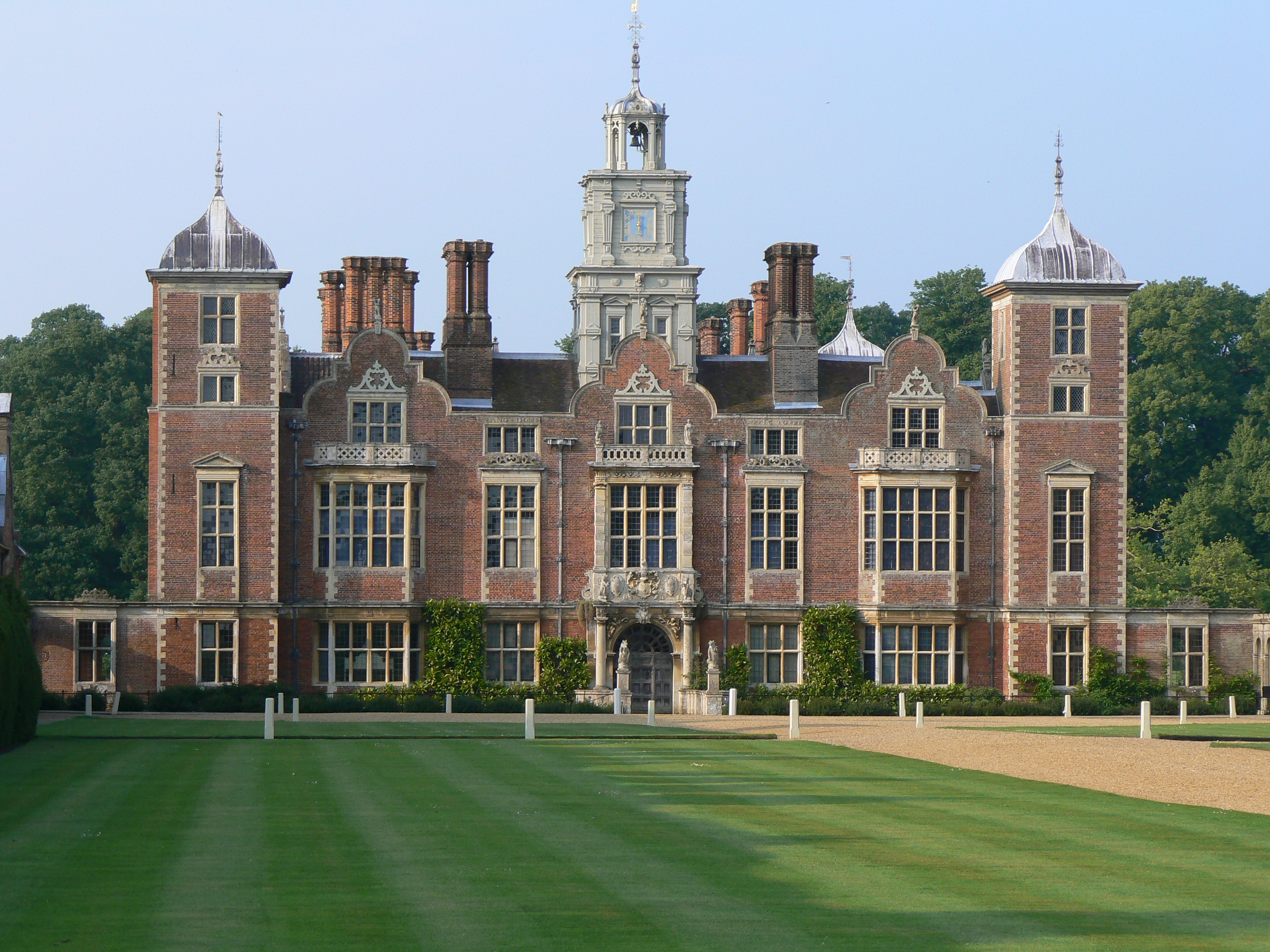
Lothian's Blickling Hall, Norfolk, England

On 16 March 1930 he succeeded his cousin as the 11th Marquess of Lothian, Earl of Ancram, Earl of Lothian, Viscount of Briene, Lord Ker of Newbattle, Lord Jedburgh, and Baron Ker of Kersheugh.

He thus entered the House of Lords taking the Liberal Whip. On hearing that his succession was imminent, when he had much other work in hand connected with politics and the Rhodes Trust, his first remark was that life was just one damned thing after another. He felt no vocation for the management of several large estates in different parts of Britain and a peerage had little appeal to him as he felt it would adversely differentiate him from his fellow men in his work and it was then not possible to renounce a peerage. As he wrote to one of the Rhodes Trustees, that this elevation, if such it were, had not come of his own seeking and he must make the best of it.

He inherited four magnificent houses with large estates. These estates lay in both Scotland and England. Altogether, in different parts of the country, he inherited lands of over 32,000 acres. In Scotland the Kerrs had been established on the Border since medieval times. Ferniehirst Castle overlooking the Jed was still in their possession but the family abode was now at Monteviot just south and the other side of Jedburgh. Also the twelve century Cisterian Newbattle Abbey on the bank of the South Esk (the Newbattle lands had been worked for coal since the Middle Ages and with it came ownership the mineral rights and a large part of the Lothian Coal company).

Of his English properties Blickling Hall was the most important. Formerly in the possession of the Boleyn and Hobart families (where Anne Boleyn, mother of Queen Elizabeth I, was thought to have been born) it had come into the possession of the Kerrs by marriage.

Most of his estates were fairly dilapidated when he inherited them, but he was able to sell enough treasures from the Blickling Library and his other properties to cover death duties and embark on a refurbishment of Blickling and, later, Monteviot.

In 1937, three years before his death, Lothian (with funds from the Carnegie Foundation) had his Newbattle Abbey turned over to the nation as a trust under the governance of the four Ancient Scottish Universities to be used as a college for adults returning to education. Another of his ancestral properties Ferniehirst Castle he made available for use as a youth hostel.

In May 1931, following his accession, he was made a Deputy lieutenant of Midlothian. After the formation of the National Government in August 1931, Lothian was appointed in the Lords as Chancellor of the Duchy of Lancaster by Ramsay MacDonald. In November of the same year he became Under-Secretary of State for India. As such he played an important role in the genesis of The Government of India Act and as chairman of the franchise committee he was largely responsible for increasing the Indian electorate from 7 to 37 million. He held the post until 1932, when he resigned from the National Government over the imposition of Commonwealth tariffs and was replaced by Rab Butler. When he was Under-Secretary of State for India, he went to see Gandhi in that vastly populated nation. He slept on the ground under the stars as Gandhi's guest at his compound while they discussed the future of democracy for that land, with its many religions and diverse population. After his resignation as Under Secretary of State, Lothian remained closely involved in matters and conferences involving India. He undertook numerous trips to India and sat on the joint select committee of The Government of India Act of 1935. Nehru and his daughter Indira Gandhi were also his guests at Blickling.

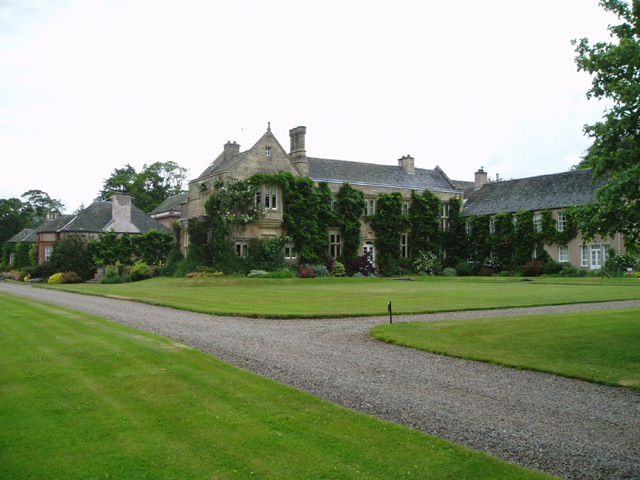
Lothian's Monteviot House, near Jedburgh on the Scottish Borders

Lothian was a key driving force behind the National Trust Act of 1937, using his position in the House of Lords to argue in favour of amendments to the Trust. He advocated permitting individuals to bequest country homes and estates to the Trust allowing descendants to pass them on to the charity without death duties and thus preserve historic national assets for the nation. This led to a huge expansion of country homes being obtained by the National Trust known as the Country Houses Scheme. On his death Lothian bequeathed his Norfolk country home Blickling Hall to the National Trust.

A believer in free enterprise and an opponent of socialism, Lothian intervened during a debate in the Lords on 21 March 1935 where he argued against the motion that The House declares that legislative effort should be directed to the gradual super-session of the capitalist system by an industrial and social order based on the public ownership and democratic control of the instruments of production and distribution. He made the contrary argument against the concept of nationalisation and argued that capitalist free enterprise was more efficient and had made and would make the population better off. He was against the protectionism that economic nationalism brought with tariffs skewing the market and a believer in capitalism and Free Trade as the best way to raise standards of living for nations. He made an argument against socialism and nationalisation and for an advantage of a free market. His intervention is referenced in full here in Hansard.

== Initial Enthusiasm for Nazi Germany ==
Lothian believed that Germany had been treated unfairly by the Treaty of Versailles and regretted that reparations had been set too harshly. Lothian had always regretted that the amount of war reparations that were imposed on Germany after the Great War had not been more generously set during the Paris Peace conference itself in 1919 when he and the world leaders were still there. Their severity was left to be decided afterwards by a separate international commission. The onerousness of these terms, when they were finally set, combined with the loss of German territories under the Peace settlement, he thought was a great mistake and gave rise to an enormous festering resentment in Germany. Hitler was later able to exploit this to the hilt in his rise to power. Lothian therefor became a steadfast advocate of revising the Treaty in Germany's favour throughout the 1920s until March 1939, a policy often now known as appeasement. Claud Cockburn, the communist journalist and Stalin propagandist, claimed Lothian was part of what he called the Cliveden set of so-called appeasers, and cartoonist David Low drew him as one of the "Shiver Sisters" dancing to Adolf Hitler's tune. For his commitment to appeasement, some later referred to him as "Lord Loathsome."

The Welsh historian Richard Griffiths made a distinction between appeasers, a term that he reserved for government officials who believed in appeasement of the Axis states for a variety of reasons, many quite pragmatic, and the enthusiasts for Nazi Germany, which he described a group of upper-class individuals who acting on their own as private citizens sought better relations with the Third Reich, usually for ideological reasons. Griffins defined Lothian as an enthusiast for Nazi Germany rather than an appeaser, noting his actions were undertaken as those of a private citizen who found much that was admirable about Nazi Germany.

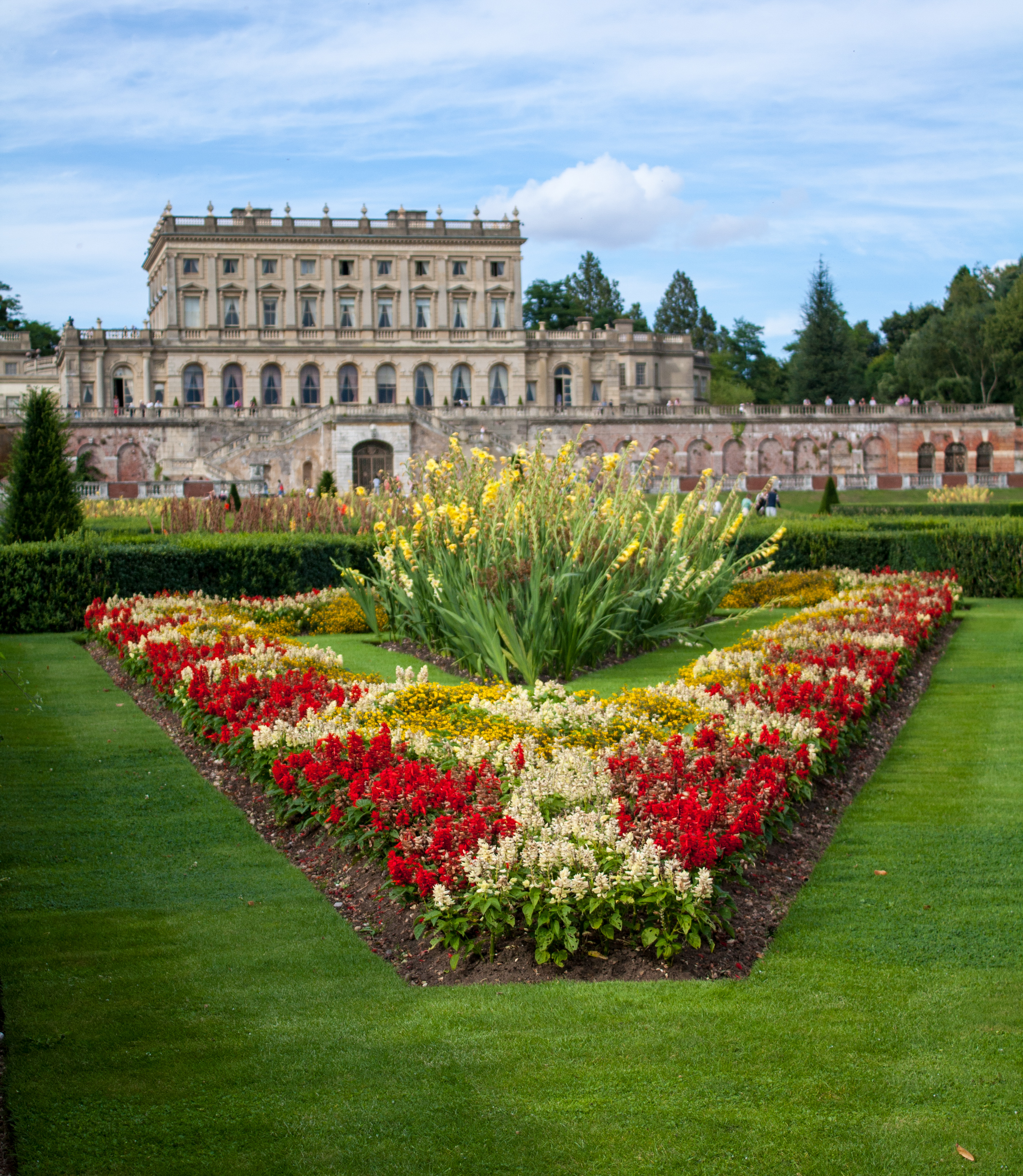
The Astors' Cliveden country house, which gave rise to the Cliveden set conspiracy theories since debunked by scholars

Speaking on 24 June 1933, at Gresham's School, Lothian said, "There probably never was a time of more uncertainty in the world than today. Every kind of political and economic philosophy is seeking approbation, and there is every kind of uncertainty about social and personal habits".

Lothian as part of his anti-Versailles lobbying had come into contact in the 1920s with Dr. Margarete Gartner of the Rheinische Frauenliga. Gartner was one of the leading promoters of the "Black Horror on the Rhine" story, which was intended to discredit both the Treaty of Versailles and France in particular. The "Black Horror on the Rhine" allegations – despite being mostly false – had done much to shift British sympathies away from France, which was accused of letting Senegalese soldiers engage in gross sexual violence against German women in the Rhineland, and towards Germany. Gartner continued to serve the new regime in Germany and in late 1933 she set up an Anglo-German Study Group, whose chairman was Lord Allen and which Lothian was a founding member. Through the study group, Lothian met Philip Conwell-Evans, a "rather shadowy" British historian who was to serve as his main contact with the Nazi regime.

Lothian was close to the South African politician Jan Christian Smuts, and like Smuts he thought the Treaty of Versailles was too harsh while also tending to think in terms of the British empire rather than Britain. Like Smuts, Lothian was mainly concerned about the possibility of a German-Japanese alliance, which might bring down the British empire, leading Lothian to write: " We must prevent a Japanese-German combination, which will be fatal. And this can only be done by ceasing to treat Germany as a pariah in Europe".

Though Lothian wrote in 1933 "like most Liberals, I loathe the Nazi regime", but also felt that "the first condition to reform it is that we should be willing to do justice to Germany". In a speech delivered in Nottingham on Armistice Day 1933 Lothian declared that "in part, at any rate, that [Nazi] regime is the product of our own conduct".

Lothian claimed that Nazi Germany did not want to "incorporate other races into itself.... [Nazism is a] national movement against internal disunity". He also claimed that the Franco-Soviet Treaty of Mutual Assistance was encircling Germany and that, deprived of an alliance with Austria-Hungary, the Polish corridor and many of its pre-1914 fortresses, Germany was weakened strategically and had good reason to pursue rearmament.

Nazi repression of domestic enemies, Jews and Social Democrats, was in Lothian's view "largely the reflex of the external persecution to which Germans have been subjected since the war". He favoured a meeting between Hitler and the British prime minister Stanley Baldwin and for British policy to be less pro-French, and he claimed that the League of Nations could not be restored unless Germany was given "a square deal in Central Europe".

=== Meeting Hitler ===
In January 1935, he went to Germany as the general secretary of the Rhodes Trust, where he met Philip Conwell-Evans, a pro-Nazi British historian who lectured on German history at the University of Königsberg in Königsberg (modern Kaliningrad, Russia). Conwell-Evans was an associate of Joachim von Ribbentrop, the special Ambassador-At-Large, and through him Lothian met Ribbentrop. Through Ribbentrop, Lothian was able to meet Hitler on 19 January 1935 with Conwell-Evans serving as the translator. Both Ribbentrop and the Deputy Fuhrer Rudolf Hess were also present at the Lothian-Hitler meeting, but as was usually the case, both men said little, content to allow der Führer to do most of the talking. Lothian came away from meeting Hitler deeply impressed and stayed in close contact with both Ribbentrop and Conwell-Evans thereafter.

On returning to Britain after the first meeting, Lothian proclaimed: "Germany does not want war and is prepared to renounce it absolutely... provided she is given real equality". Lothian came to see his role as an unofficial diplomat who would work for better Anglo-German relations. Lothian was in contact with the Foreign Office, but in common with many other British enthusiasts for Nazi Germany felt that the professional diplomats of the Foreign Office were standing in the way of an Anglo-German rapprochement.

Lothian was against demands that Britain boycott the 1936 Summer Olympics in Berlin, writing in a letter to The Times on 11 July 1935 that: ' I do not believe that individual protests under existing circumstances will have any effect except to salve our own consciences. ' He argued that the British Olympic team should go to Berlin, writing that Germany had experienced a revolution and like ' most revolutions it will now evolve, and it is essential that its evolution towards moderation should take place under British influences and the best way of ensuring that is to show that people in this country are interested in Germany and prepared to meet them on ordinary terms. ' Lothian was a member of the Anglo-German Fellowship, a group that existed to bring together the elites of Britain and Germany.

In a letter to Lord Allen, Lothian wrote: ' Every time I see Ribbentrop, and every time I know anybody going to Nazi headquarters, I tell him to tell them that the present obstacle to better Anglo-German relations to-day is the persecution of the Christians, Jews and Liberal Pacifists '. Lothian believed that revising the Treaty of Versailles would cause the Nazi regime to change its internal policies, arguing that Hitler was only acting the way he was because of the Treaty of Versailles had forced him to. In a 1936 letter to The Times, he claimed that he ' loathed all the dictatorships ', writing that ' Mussolini and the Pope are the worst ', followed up shortly by Stalin. In the same letter, Lothian wrote that Hitler ' who is a visionary rather than a gangster ', was the ' least evil of the lot ', and that ' the Germans in themselves are much better people than the Italians and the Russians '. Lothian concluded that Hitler was ' one of the creative figures of this generation '.

The Foreign Office greatly resented the activities of Lothian and the other enthusiasts as unofficial diplomats, feeling that the actions of these people caused a great many problems, not the least because Hitler and Ribbentrop seemed to have much difficulty in understanding that the enthusiasts were not speaking for the British government.

After Germany militarised the Rhineland in March 1936, Lothain, who had long felt that the one sided demilitarsation of the Rhineland was incompatible with the concession of equal rights to Germany, if not legally inconsistent with the League of Nations Covenant. He felt it was regrettable that Hitler had chosen to remilitarise the Rhineland illegally by violating both the Treaty of Versailles and the Treaty of Locarno, but argued that ' one-sided demilitarisation ' violated ' the concession of equal rights to Germany '. Lothian was opposed to the League of Nations imposing sanctions on Germany for the remilitarisation. and described the Rhineland as ' their own back garden '.

In a letter in March 1936 to his friend Jan Smuts, the South African and Commonwealth leader, Lothian wrote all of the problems in Europe were caused by France, writing that since 1871 France had been trying to ' humiliate and repress Germany ' and that French ' intransigence had been responsible for the rise of National Socialism ' there. Lothian felt that Hitler should be allowed to develop ' an Ottawa economic Mittel-Europa ', but felt that neither France nor the Soviet Union would agree to a German-dominated economic zone in eastern Europe as he accused the French and the Soviets of seeking ' a rigid encirclement of Germany '.

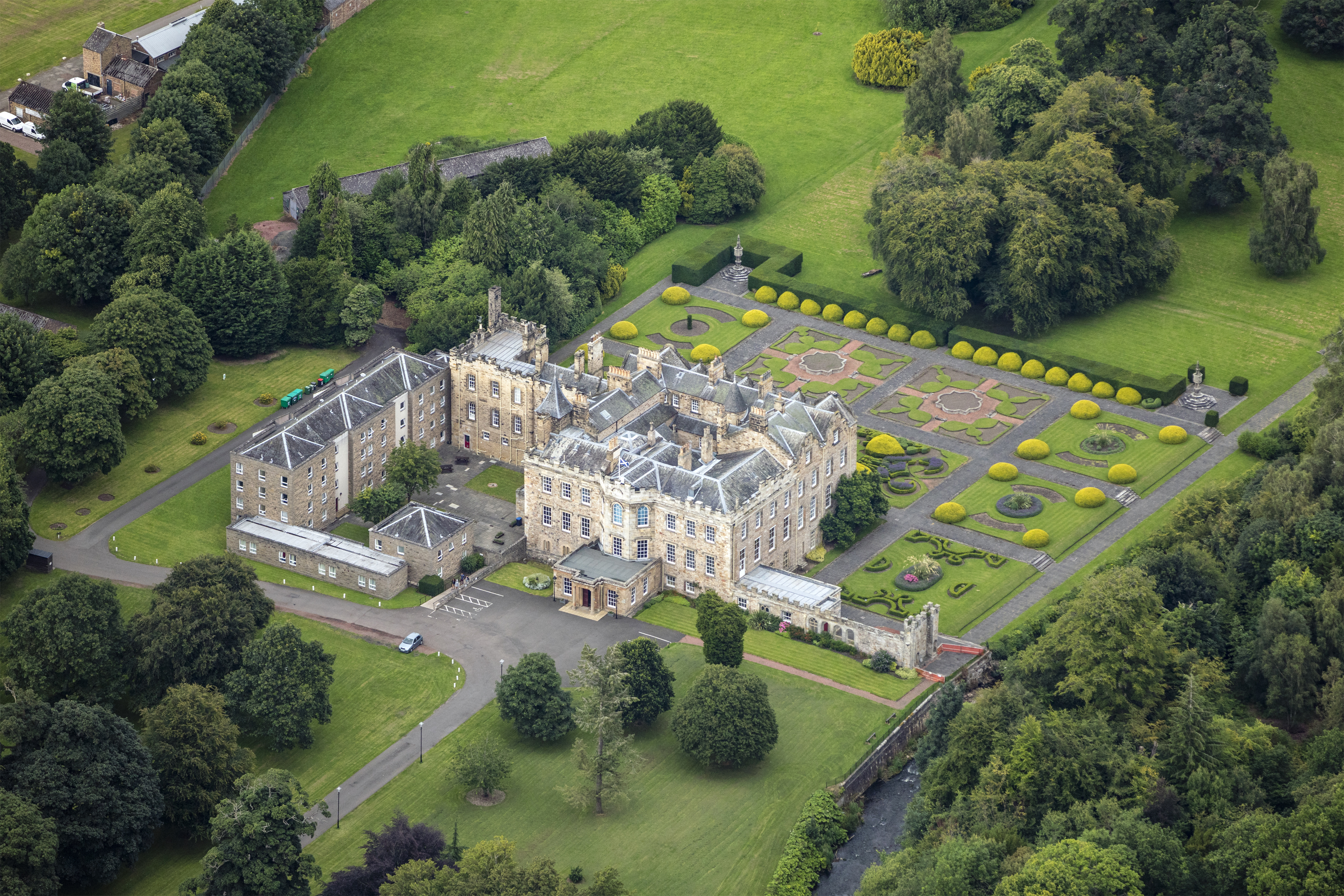
Newbattle Abbey. One of the ancestral estates Lothian inherited with the Marquessate which he gifted to the nation as a residential college for adults returning to education. The Trust was administered by the four ancient Scottish Universities

Indeed, Smuts, had shared the same view earlier in December 1934, when in an address at the Royal Institute of International Affairs he said: " How can the inferiority complex which is obsessing and, I fear, poisoning the mind, and indeed the very soul of Germany, be removed? There is only one way and that is to recognise her complete equality of status with her fellows and to do so frankly, freely and unreservedly ... While one understands and sympathises with French fears, one cannot, but feel for Germany in the prison of inferiority in which she still remains sixteen years after the conclusion of the war. The continuance of the Versailles status is becoming an offence to the conscience of Europe and a danger to future peace ... Fair play, sportsmanship—indeed every standard of private and public life—calls for frank revision of the situation. Indeed, ordinary prudence makes it imperative. Let us break these bonds and set the complexed-obsessed soul free in a decent human way and Europe will reap a rich reward in tranquility, security and returning prosperity. " . Lothian felt that Britain should pressure Paris and Moscow to change their policies by reverting to ' the old policy of detachment from Europe ', but expressed fears that Baldwin would not take such a radical step. Lothian felt that the diplomats of the Foreign Office were too pro-French to undertake the sort of foreign policy he favoured towards Germany, an assessment shared by Smuts.

=== Ribbentrop, Ambassador to Britain ===
On 2 June 1936, the by then German Ambassador to Britain (before he became Hitler's foreign minister in 1938) Ribbentrop visited Sandwich, where the Conservative peer Lord Astor and his wife, the Conservative MP Nancy Astor had a seaside home. The other guests at Sandwich that day were Lothian, Tom Jones and Sir Thomas Inskip, the new Minister for the Coordination of Defence. During the visit, Lothian emphasised 'that in any agreement with us it must be made plain that it contemplated the peaceful revision of the Treaties as they effected Austria, Memel and the rest...and Ribbentrop agreed'. These views Lothian expressed in an address to Chatham house and in a long letter to Anthony Eden, the new foreign secretary, with a copy to Chamberlain on ways to improve Anglo-German relations, which cast France as the main problem in European affairs. Chamberlain agreed with a great deal of the letter but 'had a lingering suspicion that there was no real bona fides in Germany...and that she was playing for time....' At an Anglo-German Fellowship dinner held on 14 July 1936 (a date picked deliberately to spite the French), Lothian in his speech called for the end of " the Versailles attitude of mind ", though in the same speech he also admitted that the anti-Semitic policies of the Nazi regime gave Germany an image problem in Britain.

Lothian also had other meetings with the German Ambassador as his guest at Blickling in a search for a path to avoid war.

=== Hitler's demands ===
Again in May 1937, he travelled to Germany to meet Hitler with Conwell-Evans once more serving as the translator. At the second Lothian-Hitler meeting, Hitler was joined by his economic team, namely Hermann Göring, the chief of the Four Year Plan Organisation, and Hjalmar Schacht, the Economics Minister and the president of the Reichsbank. The second Lothian-Hitler meeting was dominated by economic issues. Both Göring and Schacht-who were also both fluent in English-supported Hitler's demand at the meeting for the return of Germany's former African colonies, claiming that the German economy could not function without a colonial empire in Africa as it was asserted that Germany needed its former African colonies to feed its people without exhausting its reserves of foreign exchange (Germany had more people than German agriculture was capable of supporting, requiring the Reich to import food). At the beginning of the interview, Lothian reported that Hitler was ' in a grave mood ', but that after an hour ' the atmosphere became considerably lighter and there were smiles all round '. Lothian asked Hitler what were the causes of the " deterioration in relations from the German point of view ", and received the reply the main issues were " Abyssinia, Spain and the colonial question ". Hitler ended the interview by saying that " common sense would prevail and...the two peoples [German and English] racially alike with the finest qualities would not commit suicide by waging war against each other ".

Lothian wrote after his second visit to Germany that the international situation was ' both more dangerous and more soluble than I thought '. Lothian came away convinced that Hitler's main demand was the return of Germany's lost colonial empire in Africa, which led him to conclude that Britain, France, Belgium and South Africa should return the former German colonies in Africa to the Reich. Lothian also believed that Hitler only wanted an anschluss with Austria, which he supported and wanted more rights for the German minorities in Poland and the Czechoslovakia.

Lothian believed that Hitler did not want either the lands lost to Poland by the Treaty of Versailles and the Sudetenland, and only wanted better protection for German minorities in both Czechoslovakia and Poland, demands that Lothian felt were both reasonable and just. In his account of his second interview, Lothian wrote that Hitler had no interest "in dominating other nations, but only in securing Germany's own rights and place in the world". He also described National Socialism as a "fundamentally popular movement" and that ' Hitler's power rests on popular support '. In support of this thesis, Lothian cited the referendums held in the Third Reich where the Nazis always won 99% of the votes cast, accepting at face value Hitler's statement that the plebiscites were " the form of democracy appropriate to Germany ".

In May, Lothian wrote to Lloyd George: ' If we join or drift into the anti-German group, we shall have world war. The only way to peace is justice for Germany [and] a German solution of the Austrian problem '. A month later, he wrote to Foreign Secretary Anthony Eden: ' Personally I believe that, if we assist Germany to escape from encirclement to a position of balance in Europe, there is a good chance of the 25 years of peace of which Hitler spoke '. After meeting Hitler on a second occasion, Lothian wrote a memorandum to Neville Chamberlain:

I am sure that the idea that by strengthening the military combination against Germany and continuing relentlessly the economic pressure against her, the régime in Germany can be moderated or upset, is an entire mistake.... The German people are determined by some means or other to recover their natural rights and position in the world equal to that of the great powers. If they feel driven to use force in power-diplomacy or war, they will do so with a terrifying strength, decision and vehemence. Moreover, because they are now beginning to think that England is the barrier in the way, they are already playing with the idea that... they may have to look for support... to Italy and Japan, if they are to achieve their aims.

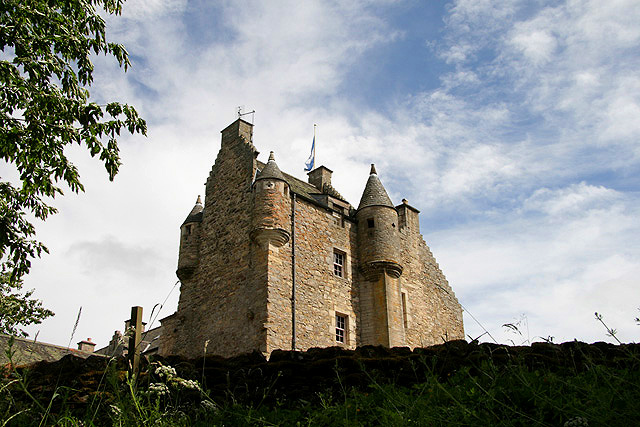
Ferniehirst Castle on the Scottish Borders. One of the ancestral properties inherited by Lothian with the Marquessate and given by him for use as a youth hostel.

When Chamberlain visited Germany in September 1938 to meet Hitler to resolve the Sudetenland crisis, Lothian felt the initiative was ' noble and heroic '. Lothian wrote that ' having gone as far as we have I'm inclined to think that rather than split the country and the democratic world by immediate concessions we ought to say that if Hitler invades Czechoslovakia it means war...We have, I think, strong cards in the long run and I think Hitler would hesitate. But if, having gone as far as we have in the last three weeks, we run away now and do something which is tantamount to " selling the pass " the prestige of the totalitarian methods and powers will be such, and the derision and depression of the democracies so acute, that it will go hard with the old British Empire. ' After Chamberlain signed the Munich Agreement with Hitler in 1938, Lothian expressed relief and said that Chamberlain had done " a marvellous job.... [he is] the only man who steadfastly refused to accept the view that Hitler and the Nazis were incorrigible and would understand nothing but the big stick ".

The German-born American historian Abraham Ascher wrote that anyone reading of the relationship between Lord Lothian together with the Canadian prime minister William Lyon Mackenzie King ' cannot avoid being taken aback by the superficiality and gullibility of these two authors ' as both Lord Lothian and Mackenzie King convinced themselves that Hitler was an idealistic man of peace.

== Change of mind to believing Hitler's Germany presented a grave threat ==
In late 1938, Lothian read Mein Kampf, which led him to become disillusioned with Nazi Germany. At least part of the disillusionment was because in Mein Kampf, Hitler made it clear that his principal issue was not with the Treaty of Versailles, but rather with the Dolchstoß ("stab-in-the-back") that was alleged to have caused the German defeat in 1918. The implications of these views was Hitler was not angry with the alleged unjust Treaty of Versailles, but rather with the fact that Germany had lost the First World War, as he made it clear that only a German victory in 1918 would have satisfied him. Lothian had been prepared to see the Treaty of Versailles revised in favour of Germany, but he was not willing to accept a German-dominated Europe, which he learned from Mein Kampf was what Hitler was seeking.

In 1934, Lothian came to believe, that the Covenant of the League of Nations, without the United States, could not prevent war and the only way out was for the US, France and the British Empire to guarantee the underlying concept of the Peace Conference and discharge through the League the ultimate stabilising function. He warned, ' we are steadily drifting back towards a worse war than the last ' . But even then, the actions of Mussolini's invasion of Abyssinia and then Hitler's re-armament and occupation of the demilitarised Rhineland in March 1936, in contempt of the League, were driving events.

By 1935 Lothian already felt the Wilsonian League was dead and that the imperative was to ' think out the Commonwealth's relation in world affairs with ruthless realism and free from the illusions of the last fifteen years.' He felt that the solution for keeping the peace would be in an agreement with the British Commonwealth and the US ‘ to control the oceans in this century as Great Britain alone controlled them in the last ’ (i.e. in the century of world stability before the First World War).

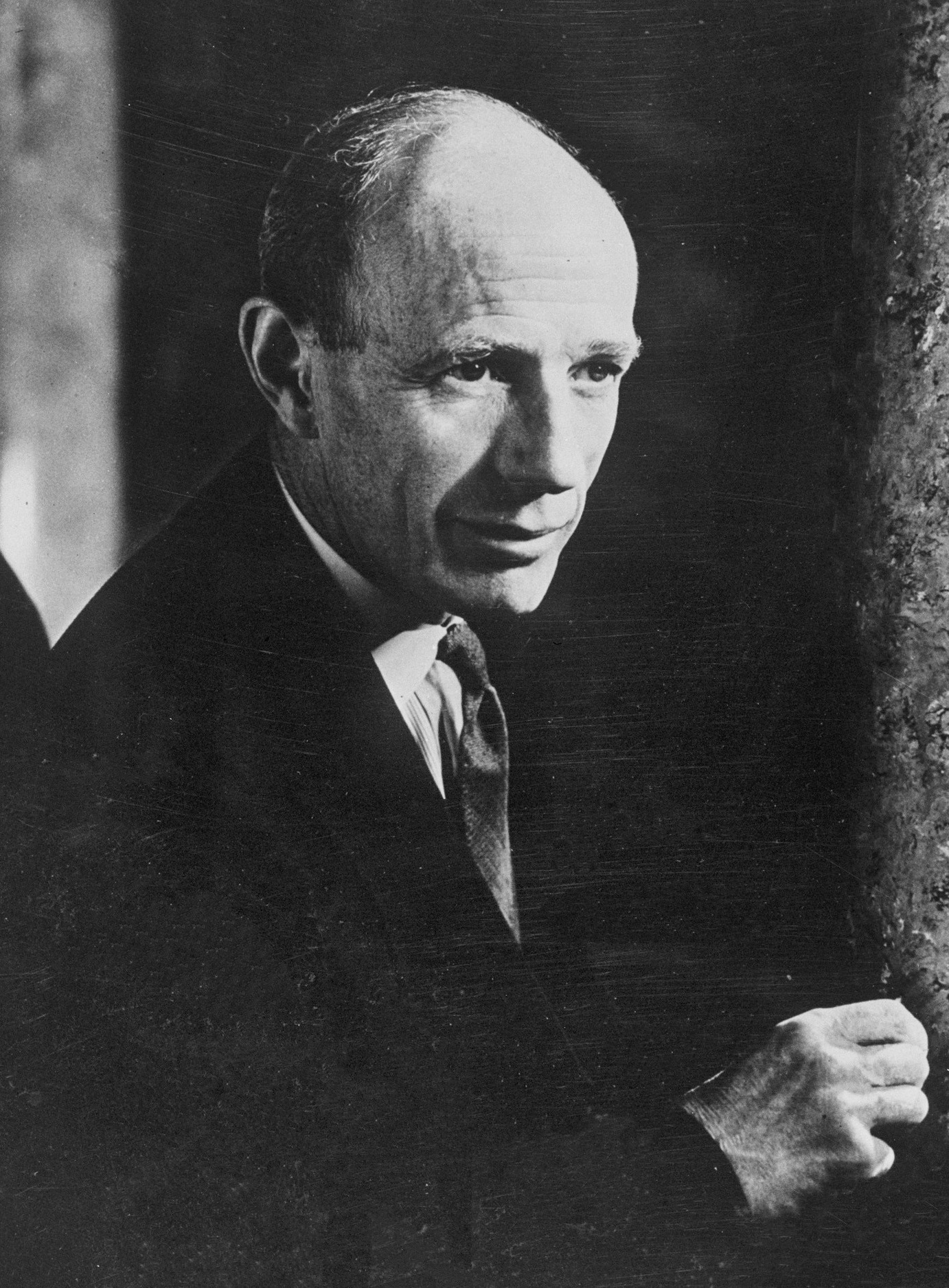
Lord Halifax, British Foreign Secretary

At the 1937 Imperial Conference, Lothian had strongly urged the Dominion prime ministers to oppose Britain giving any commitments in Europe. The member of the cabinet whom Lothian was closest to was Lord Halifax, who served as the Foreign Secretary between 1938 and 1940. By early 1938, Lothian had become convinced of ' a momentum behind power politics which is becoming dangerous ' . Lothian felt that ' a little more international vigour ' was needed on the part of Britain and France, whose governments now needed to make clear ' that there are conditions under which we are willing to face war ' , or the totalitarian states would ' begin to get out of hand ' .

Lothian now insisted, in opposition to the regular supporters of the League, that the collective security, which it offered, was delusive and he urged Stanley Baldwin, by then Prime Minister, to recognise this. Lothian felt Britain must re-arm. Lionel Curtis had been the impetus behind the founding of the Royal Institute of International Affairs (Chatham House), a body of international expertise he believed was absolutely necessary after the frustrating experience at the Paris Peace Conference. There the allies had found themselves woefully lacking in knowledge of so many of the more obscure international issues that had come before them. Lothian had been present at the meeting of delegates brought together by Curtis that was responsible for the founding of Chatham House (and at the same meeting the birth of the US's Council on Foreign Relations) at the Hotel Majestic in Paris.

In 1936 Lothian wrote Curtis.

I was told on the best of authority a few days ago that within a year or so Germany will have 90 Divisions against our expeditionary force of about four, and possibly 4,000 front line aeroplanes against our 2,000.

In fact, his intelligence on the German strength was close to the mark although the British situation was actually even more dire. When war broke out three years later Germany had 105 divisions and 4,000 aircraft; not till then did Britain have four divisions equipped for continental warfare and under 1,500 aircraft. Britain was faced with overwhelming odds. Britain's survival became a matter of playing for time.

His change of mind was reinforced after Hitler's violation of the Munich Agreement by the occupation of Czechoslovakia in March 1939. ' Up until then it was possible ', he wrote to a friend, Thomas William Lamont, on 29 March 1939, ' to believe that Germany was only concerned with recovery of what might be called the normal rights of a great power, but it now seems clear that Hitler is in effect a fanatical gangster who will stop at nothing to beat down all possibility of resistance anywhere to his will ' . In a speech in the House of Lords in April 1939, Lothian spoke in favour of peacetime conscription, a first in British history as the only way to deter Germany from war.

It soon became clear to him that war with Germany once again was now only a matter of time. On 5 June 1939 he urged the British Foreign Secretary, Lord Halifax, to reply to Hitler's latest outburst in Berlin and make a vigorous challenging rejoinder for him to ' abandon gangster politics ' and Halifax went some way in doing so but the die had already been cast. It was to be only a matter of months.

== Was a Second World War inevitable? ==
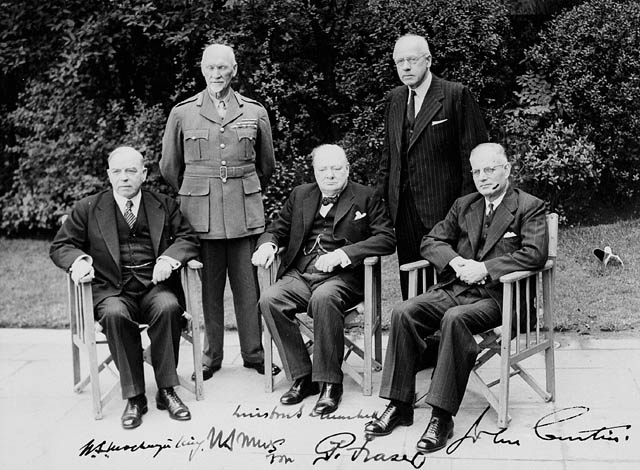
The Commonwealth Prime Ministers in 1944. (L-R): Rt. Hon. W.L. Mackenzie King (Canada) General the Rt. Hon. Jan Smuts (South Africa) Rt. Hon. Winston Churchill (United Kingdom) Rt. Hon. Peter Fraser (New Zealand) Rt. Hon. John Curtin (Australia)

After the Second World War broke out the British leaders of the time, including Lothian, were later accused of following a policy of appeasement towards Germany in prior years.

Fifteen years before Britain and its allies had endured the bloodiest war in history. Millions had been slaughtered including many of the best and the brightest of their generation. Before another war became inevitable it was the duty of British and other leaders to work to avoid a new conflict, the cost of which in lives and failed democracies was simply too dreadful to calculate. In this they mirrored the views of the vast majority of the population.

As Anthony Eden wrote in the early 1930s, the word "appeasement" was still used in its correct sense (from the Oxford English Dictionary) of seeking to settle strife. Only later in the decade would it come to acquire a pejorative meaning of acceding to bullying demands.

Harry Hodson, subsequently the editor of The Sunday Times wrote after he retired "We also need to remember — and those of a younger generation need to be told — that to cling to the hope and intention of peace in Europe was not only an honest and honourable policy, at least up to 1938, but also the attitude of the nation as a whole. Rarely has there been a more widely, even hysterically, applauded stroke of British foreign policy than the Munich settlement. Rarely has there been a stroke so unanimously endorsed by the independent nations of the Commonwealth... The Commonwealth, up to 1933, was totally unready, not merely for war, but for the very idea of another war in Europe, like that which had drained the best of their manpower a generation earlier. British public opinion was more aware of the danger, but almost equally unwilling to face it... The war of 1914-18 had only divided Europe further, sowing the seeds of its own successor. Another bout of devastation, disillusionment and exhaustion was needed before Western Europe could unite."

The Paris Peace Conference of 1919 and the League of Nations had been the sincere efforts by the victors to re-order the tensions of the world and build in safeguards so as to prevent a world war ever breaking out again.

The results of the Peace Conference were not perfect. President Wilson's lack of success, even at the cost of his own health and life, in persuading the American Congress to join his concept, the League of Nations, the Covenant of which was the foundation upon which much of the Peace Conference guarantees rested, was a serious setback. Lothian had perceived the problem and warned in Paris at the time about accommodating the American Congress in the formation of the League but was overruled.

Whether Hitler's rise and another war could have been avoided we cannot be sure. Quite possibly a larger conflict could have been avoided by a stronger League of Nations with American participation. Or by less stringent terms for Germany in Paris. Even by earlier pre-emptive strikes on Germany in the 1930s if the allies had re-armed and could back up their guarantees. But by then their forces were comparatively weak. In the event earlier military intervention was not an option open to them.

The added problem the allies faced was they were attempting to enforce the treaties with the former combatants who had to keep their armaments within defined limits below their own (in fact Hitler secretly broke these treaties as he did almost every one his Germany or he ever signed).

In the end, Lothian and successive governments had been mistaken in thinking that Hitler and Germany could have been persuaded to avoid another war.

== Commonwealth conference 1938 ==
Lothian was leader of the British delegation to the second Commonwealth Conference in September 1938, organised by the Royal Institute of International Affairs (Chatham House) and held at Lapstone near Sydney, Australia. This was a year before he became the British Ambassador to the United States. This conference followed the initial one held in Toronto in 1933. This second one in Australia was held just a year prior to WWII and therein lay its importance.

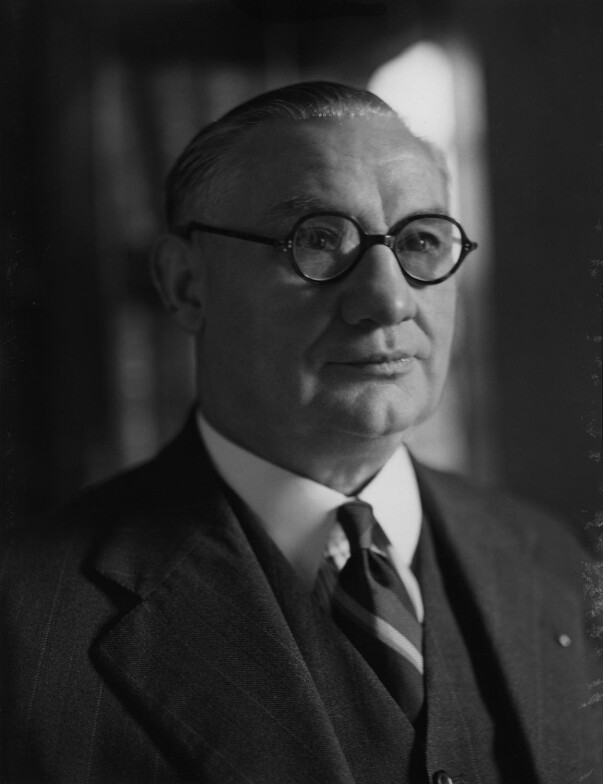
Ernest Bevin (later to become Foreign Secretary in the post war Attlee Labour government)

The rest of the delegation from Britain included the General Secretary of the Transport and General Workers' Union Ernest Bevin, (he subsequently served as Minister of Labour and National Service in the wartime coalition government and British Foreign Minister in the post-WWII Attlee Labour government), James Walker M.P., General John Burnett-Stuart, Admiral John Kelly, Geoffrey Vickers V.C., Lionel Curtis, Harry Hodson (the Conference Recorder) and Ivison Macadam (the Conference organising secretary).

The significance of this conference was that it exposed the then five Commonwealth countries, (Canada, Australia, New Zealand, South Africa and the United Kingdom) to the possibility that war with Germany lay ahead and it gave each of them a full year to prepare and decide whether each of these independent Commonwealth nations would voluntarily commit their armed forces should war break out.

In the event when War did break out, they all committed at their own volition to declare their nations at war with Germany after Britain had done so on 3 September 1939. As it turned out Britain could not have held out on its own without the Commonwealth countries contribution after the fall of France and before the United States joined the conflict in December 1941 and so they were then and later to play a vital role in the Battle of the Atlantic, the Italian Campaign, the Normandy landings and the many other land and sea battles that led to the liberation of Europe and the ultimate defeat of Hitler's forces.

== Ambassador to the United States ==
From the spring of 1938 onward, the foreign secretary, Lord Halifax had considered appointing his friend Lothian to replace Ronald Lindsay, the retiring ambassador in Washington. The Permanent Undersecretary at the Foreign Office, Sir Alexander Cadogan, vehemently objected to Lothian as ambassador, saying the post should go to a professional diplomat rather than an "outsider", one who moreover had set himself up as an opponent of the Foreign Office with regard to Germany. Additionally, Lothian's most important political post had been as the right-hand man to Lloyd George, and there were concerns that "he had never held a position of independent responsibility". However, the fact that Lothian as the general secretary of the Rhodes Trust had often visited the United States; had many American friends including President Roosevelt; and was well known as a proponent of closer Anglo-American ties led Halifax to override Cadogan's objections. Lindsay himself endorsed Lothian as his successor, writing to Halifax that Lothian was the best man to deal with the American media.

As far back as between 1934 and 1936 Lothian had made fourteen trips to the United States and visited forty-four states so he already knew how Americans discerned the world and what they thought not only in Washington and New York but in the Middle West, South and Pacific states and had already been enamoured by his knowledge of the United States.

Lothian was sworn into the Privy Council in August 1939.

In September 1939, Lothian was appointed Ambassador to the United States, a post he held until his death, the following year.

So when the inevitable conflict came, Lothian had already been appointed Ambassador to Washington where he arrived a few days before its outbreak. There he was to play a pivotal role and he probably did more than any individual, other than Churchill, to get a neutral United States finally involved in the Second World War. He did so by stressing America's own self-interest rather than the plight of the Allies. He made sure Americans knew it was their decision to make. But he pointed out that without a British Navy in the Atlantic the US would be vulnerable to attack on their own shores. He knew the history and contribution to liberty and democracy that the United States had made. He also understood how to appeal to the American patriotic heartstrings – as well as how to pull other strings - in those desperate days.

Lothian played a central role in enlisting American support for economic aid to the British war effort. His change of view of Nazi intentions and the following 1939 invasion of Czechoslovakia led him, as Ambassador to the United States, to seek a comprehensive program of aid for Britain. On 1 September 1939, Lothian arrived at the White House to present his credentials to his longstanding friend President Roosevelt as His Britannic Majesty's Ambassador Extraordinary and Plenipotentiary to the United States of America. The ritual, which was normally a formality under which the new ambassador presents his credentials to the president who then accepts them, was overshadowed by the news that Germany invaded Poland earlier that day. Most of the meeting was taken up with the discussion of the crisis in Europe with Roosevelt telling Lothian that he sympathised with the Allies with "every fibre", but that he had to obey the US Neutrality laws passed by Congress or else face impeachment for violating the law.

=== Using the media to get the message across ===
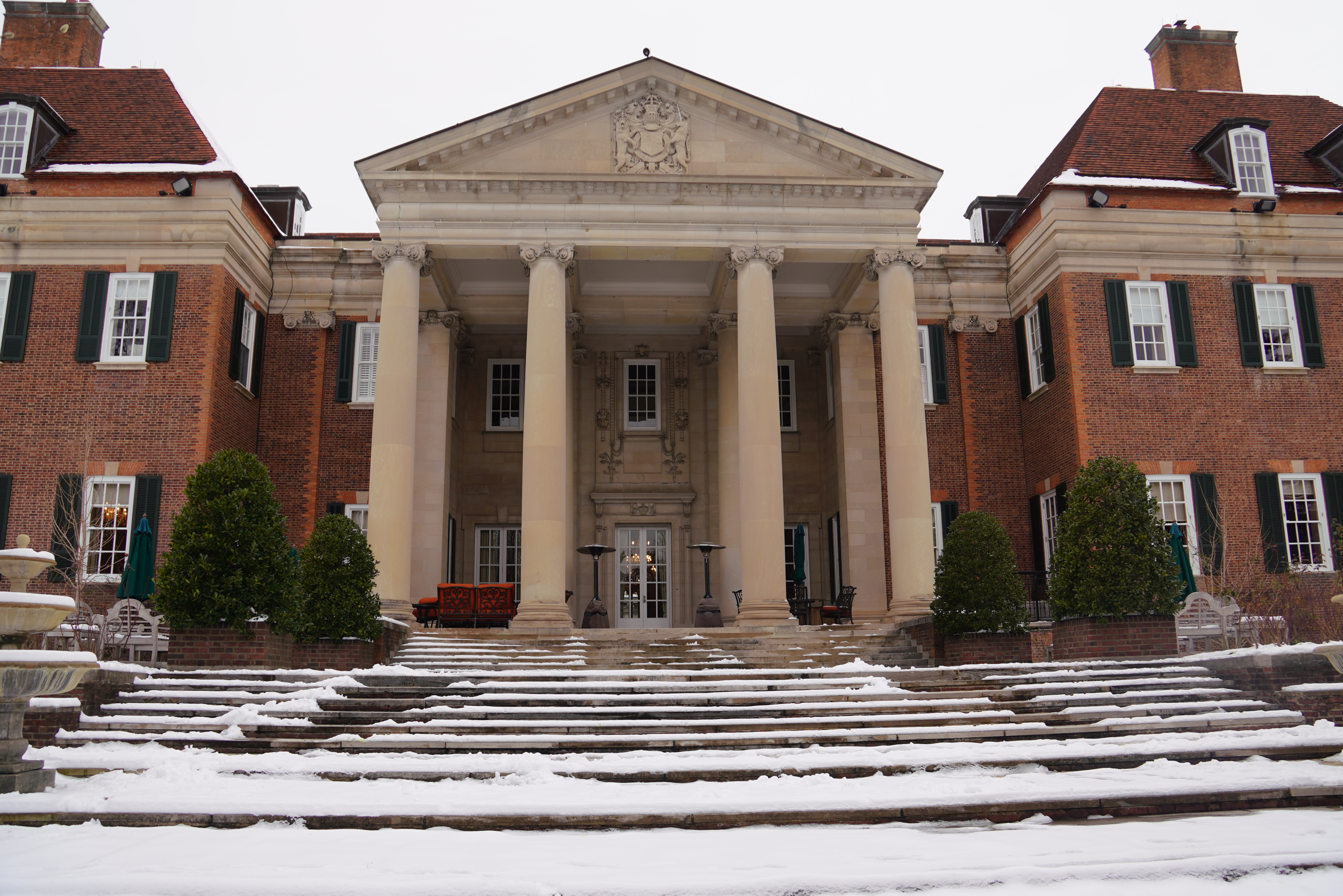
British Embassy Washington D.C.

Unlike Lindsay who chose to stay out of the limelight, Lothian aggressively sought media attention right from the moment he arrived in the United States to get the British message across directly to the American people. Lothian sought to engage in what he called "mutual education" by talking to the American media as much as possible, which won the disapproval of the Foreign Office, who felt that Lothian was debasing the office of an ambassador by acting like a salesman for an Anglo-American friendship. Lothian's various eccentricities and his sometimes erratic behavior also worried the Foreign Office. However Lothian proved he was right in this as he chose to engage in populist gestures and became a media star as the American historian Joseph Perisco noted that Lothian: "...grasped that Americans were much taken with bluebloods exhibiting a just-plain-folks demeanor. Thus, he wore a battered gray fedora, drove his own car, and bought his own train tickets when travelling in the United States." Lothian's sense of humour also appealed to Americans who liked an aristocrat who was not pompous or stuffy. Lothian humorously would point out to American visitors a gigantic portrait of King George III that stood in the lobby of the embassy, saying this was the "founder of the American republic".

Upon his arrival in Washington D.C., Lothian accepted the advice of Robert "Van" Vansittart, the Chief Diplomatic Adviser, to accept the services of a British historian living in the United States, John Wheeler-Bennett, the "archetypal Anglo-American intellectual – an Oxford don and visiting lecturer at the University of Virginia equally at home at the High Table or pacing the battlefields of the American Civil War". Wheeler-Bennett who owned an estate in Virginia and wrote a weekly column in The Evening Standard become Lothian's principal adviser on American affairs. Wheeler-Bennett as a wealthy "gentleman of private means" was not an official employee of the British embassy, which proved to be a great advantage because as a private citizen Wheeler-Bennett was exempt from the rules forbidding embassy employees openly lobbying to influence American public opinion.

=== Lothian's disguised propaganda organisations ===
Wheeler-Bennett was Lothian's main contact man with the Fight for Freedom Committee. Though he had initial doubts about Lothian's suitability as ambassador, he soon discovered that Lothian tended to accept his advice that the best way to "sell" the British cause was by identifying it with the American values. Wheeler-Bennett criss-crossed the States lecturing to a wide group of organisations in thirty-seven states to boost morale.

Wheeler-Bennett reported to Lothian that Americans had already written off Britain as bravely defeated and most spoke to him of the nation in tones used for the late bereaved. To counter this impression Lothian quietly formed the British Information Services in New York and put Wheeler-Bennett and Aubrey Niel Morgan, (brother-in-law of aviator Charles Lindbergh although he did not share his views) in charge. Its job was to convey Britain's ability to wage war, the determination of its people to see it through and their desire that a better world would emerge from the struggle.

To handle "black propaganda" in the United States, Lothian appointed a Canadian businessman William Stephenson to head the British Security Co-ordination group from an office in New York at Rockefeller Center in order to provide some distance from the British embassy.

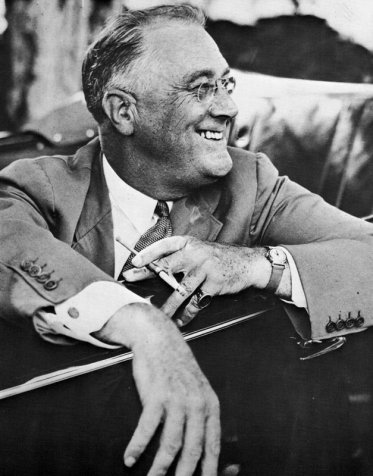
President Franklin D. Roosevelt.

=== Importance of public opinion ===
Lothian wrote to Halifax about how important the views of ordinary Americans were: "To an extent unknown under the parliamentary system, it is public opinion as revealed in the press, the Gallup polls, the tornado of telegrams addressed to Congress" that were the deciding influence on the Administration's and Congressional actions.

Time magazine on which Lothian was on the cover on 8 July 1940 reported in its cover-story that:

'Lord Lothian is the most popular British Ambassador Washington has seen since the late, great Lord Bryce.'
Time, July 8, 1940

In late 1939, Lothian came into conflict with the First Lord of the Admiralty, Winston Churchill, who he discovered had opened a correspondence with President Franklin D. Roosevelt, which Lothian objected to as undercutting his role. Lothian demanded that Churchill stop his correspondence with Roosevelt, and the dispute was mediated by the foreign secretary, Lord Halifax. Halifax declared in January 1940 that Churchill could continue his correspondence, but had to provide copies of the correspondence to Lothian to ensure that the ambassador was being "kept in the loop".

In January 1940, Lothian faced his first crisis when the State Department submitted a note of protest to him against the British blockade of Germany as the Royal Navy stopped American merchantmen and tankers in the Atlantic on their way to Germany or to places where the supplies would be shipped on to the Reich. Jay Pierrepont Moffat, the head of the State Department's European Affairs Division, told Lothian that "there was a general feeling that the United States had been particularly friendly towards Great Britain, had even gone out of its way to give special forms of help, but that Great Britain has taken this friendship for granted". Lothian told Moffat that he "wanted to be of help" while a dispatch to Lord Halifax presented the issue as a matter of public relations, warning that the blockade was damaging Britain's image in the United States. Lothian wrote to Halifax that ' we have to prove to the US, which includes public opinion as well as the administration that any action we are taking is really necessary for the winning of the war '. Lothian concluded: ' The one fatal thing is for us to offer the United States advice as to what she ought to do. We have never listened to the advice of foreigners. Nor will the Americans '. The issue was settled in February 1940 when Frank Ashton-Gwatkin of the Ministry of Economic Warfare was attached to the British embassy with orders to handle the American complaints against the blockade, which made it seem like the British were changing their policies when they were in fact not.

=== Churchill becomes Prime Minister ===
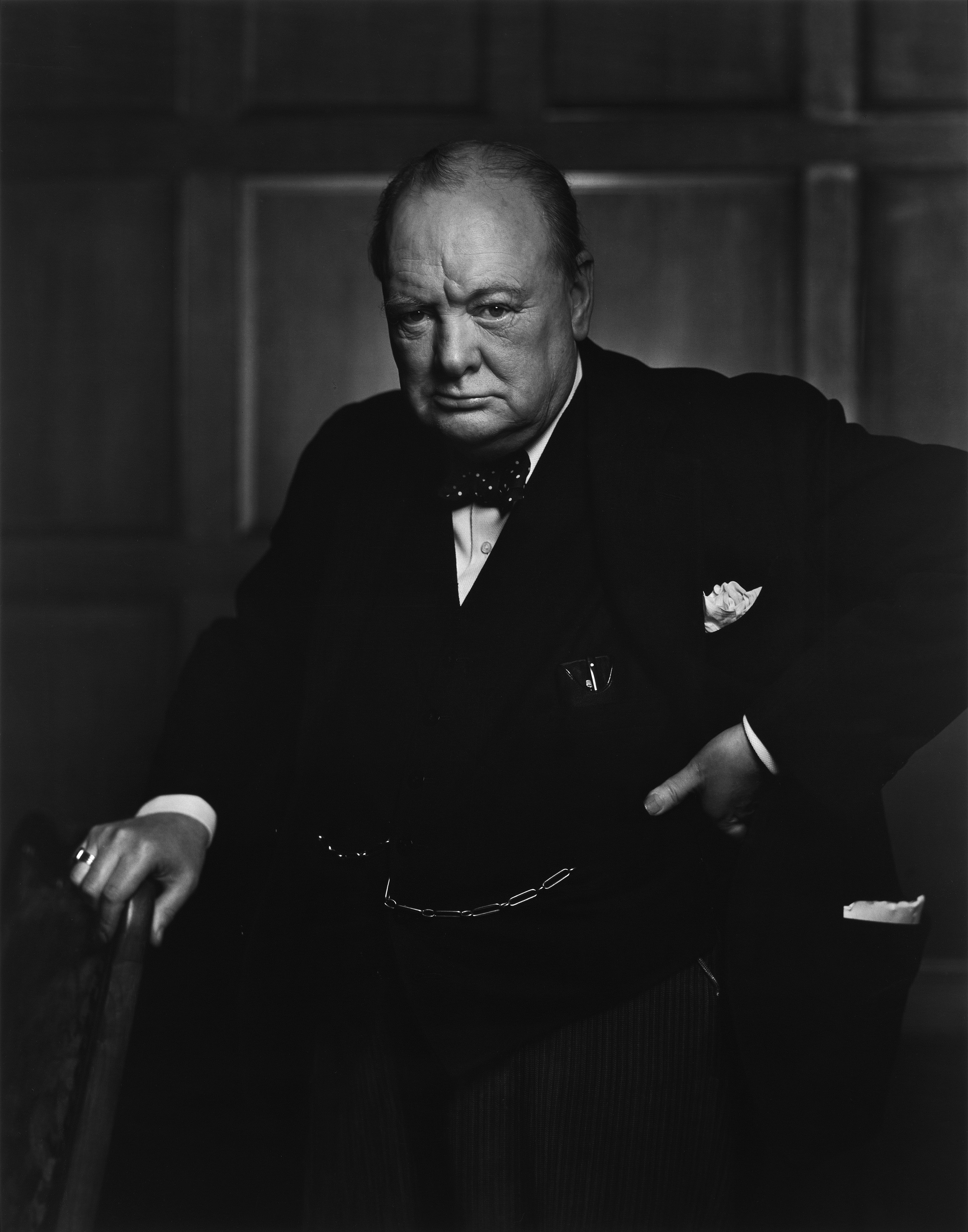
Winston Churchill in Ottawa, Canada, 1941

On 10 May 1940, Anglo-American relations were changed when Churchill became prime minister. The half-American Churchill put far more emphasis on Anglo-American relations than Chamberlain had ever done, and Lothian found himself heading what was now the most important British embassy in the world. Moffat recorded Lothian as saying: " He [Lothian] said that nine days out of ten Churchill was magnificent, but the tenth day during a crisis he was apt to lose his head, close his ears and refuse to listen to reason. Despite this weakness, Lothian felt he had the exuberance, drive and leadership which England craved ". During the Norway campaign and the Dunkirk evacuation, a number of Royal Navy destroyers were either sunk by the Luftwaffe or badly damaged, putting them into the repair yards for months.

On 13 May 1940 Churchill gave his first speech on becoming prime minister, his Blood, toil, tears and sweat speech electrified the House of Commons and the wider public.

The Dunkirk evacuation of the British army between 26 May to 4 June 1940 saw the rescue of most of the British army (and Belgium and French troops) by Royal Navy ships, some of which were sunk, and ordinary British citizens in hundreds of small boats and craft that could get close to the beaches crossing the English Channel while under heavy German air bombardment. Lothian urged the British government and the Ministry of Information to play up the heroism of the evacuation rather than the retreat. They did so. He knew that it would play to the sympathies of the American people. Lothian was now beginning to affect public opinion, which he knew was the vital ingredient to effect American political decisions, unlike the British Parliamentary system.

It worked. All of the British papers headlined the heroism as did most of the American. The rescue of the British army began to be perceived as a miraculous triumph. On 1 June 1940 The New York Times in an editorial reflecting the views of many Americans described the evacuation, ' So long as the English tongue survives, the word Dunkirk will be spoken with reverence...' For in that harbour in such a hell ... at the end of a lost battle, the rags and blemishes that have hidden the soul of democracy fell away. There beaten but unconquered, in shining splendour, she faced the enemy...It was the result of common man of the free countries...This shining thing in the souls of men Hitler cannot command, or attain, or conquer. He has crushed it, where he could, from German hearts. It is the great tradition of democracy. It is the future. It is victory. '

The evacuation from Dunkirk followed after large numbers of Belgian, British and French troops had been surrounded and cut off by German forces during the Battle of France which ended with Germany overrunning France in a terrifyingly short six weeks.

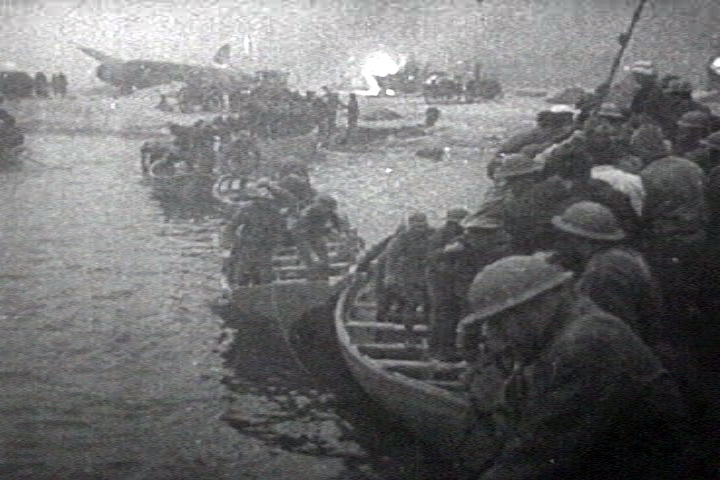
British troops being evacuated from Dunkirk by small boats

Then Britain and the Commonwealth stood alone against the Nazi might. At least for the moment, from the American perspective, Britain's survival did not look likely. Lothian knew it was vital that he dispel that.

Lothian urged Churchill to make it clear that, whatever happened the consequences, Britain and the Commonwealth would fight on alone. On 4 June 1940, Churchill delivered his revered speech We shall fight on the beaches to the House of Commons. It resonated with the American public, and Churchill became a hero not just at home but across the United States.

Dunkirk and Churchill's speech helped convince the people of the United States that they should give Britain all possible aid as Lothian had hoped. Now more than 80% of Americans supported sending arms to Britain but Lothian was frustrated that Roosevelt and his administration was not yet ready to act in a presidential election year.

Churchill warned in another powerful speech on 16 June 1940 This was their finest hour:

"The whole fury and might of the enemy must very soon be turned on us. Hitler knows that he will have to break us in this island or lose the war. If we can stand up to him, all Europe may be freed and the life of the world may move forward into broad, sunlit uplands. But if we fail, then the whole world, including the United States, including all that we have known and cared for, will sink into the abyss of a new Dark Age made more sinister, and perhaps more protracted, by the lights of perverted science. Let us therefore brace ourselves to our duties, and so bear ourselves that, if the British Empire and its Commonwealth last for a thousand years, men will still say, "This was their finest hour."

These three speeches by Churchill had a profound effect on the American public but there was still much more for the Ambassador to accomplish.

=== Laying the groundwork for US destroyers for Britain in spite of the US Neutrality act ===
On 22 July 1940, Lothian advised the prime minister Winston Churchill that now was the best time to resume contacts with Roosevelt about the possibility of the United States supplying Britain with 50 destroyers. The American ambassador in London, Joseph P. Kennedy Sr., had advised Churchill against making "emotional blackmail" against Roosevelt - a warning taken seriously given that Kennedy was a close friend of the president. As a result of Kennedy's warnings, Churchill had not been in contact with Roosevelt for the last six weeks.

On 25 July 1940, Lothian received a copy of an Admiralty memo stating that the Royal Navy had a total of 176 destroyers operating around the world. The same memo stated that the Royal Navy had a total of 68 destroyers operating at any given moment in British home waters while there was only the prospect of 10 new destroyers coming out of British shipyards in the next four months, leaving the Royal Navy unable to cope with the U-boat attacks in the home waters owing to a shortage of destroyers. Britain had far more people than British agriculture was capable of supplying, requiring Britain to import food on a massive scale to feed its people while the United Kingdom also needed to import oil to keep its economy and military functioning. If the U-boats sunk enough merchantmen and tankers, then the British economy would be severely damaged; the Royal Air Force, the Royal Navy and much of the British Army would rendered ineffective; and finally a famine that would kill millions would almost certainly force Britain to surrender.

Lothian who cultivated the American media intensely during his ambassadorship leaked the memo to a number of his American friends such as Henry Luce and Norman Davis, in order to give the Royal Navy's destroyer shortage maximum coverage in the American media. Lothian was disobeying orders in leaking the memo, and to cover his tracks, Lothian asked the American media not to use the precise figure of 68 destroyers, instead asking them to print that the Royal Navy had only 60-70 destroyers in home waters. Before Lothian leaked the memo, American newspapers usually claimed that the Royal Navy had between 150 and 200 destroyers in the home waters, and the revelation of the destroyer shortage was used by American advocates of aid to Britain as an example of how the United States could aid the United Kingdom by supplying more destroyers. On 30 July 1940, Lothian advised Churchill to disregard Kennedy's warnings, writing: "Strong pressure is being brought on the president to reconsider the possibility of supplying us with destroyers. Now is the moment to send him a most moving statement of our needs and dangers in respect of destroyers and flying boats that you can, if you have not already done so".

Lothian's use of the American media helped prepare the way for the Destroyers for Bases deal of 2 September 1940 under which the United States supplied destroyers in exchange for leases on British bases in the New World. By the fall of 1940, the State Department had come to prefer Lothian's views over those of Kennedy who reported to Roosevelt that Britain would soon be defeated. Moffat wrote: "If Kennedy says something is black and Lothian says it is white, we believe Lord Lothian".

=== Initial hesitation to give up British bases ===
It was in late May 1940 that Lothian first suggested what became the destroyers-for-bases deal under which the Royal Navy would receive 50 aging American destroyers in exchange for the Royal Navy and the Royal Air Force giving up British naval and air bases in the British West Indies, Bermuda, British Guiana (modern Guyana) and Newfoundland to the US Navy and the United States Army Air Force on 99 year leases.

Churchill was initially opposed to the destroyers-for-bases deal, arguing that Britain was giving up far more than what she was receiving. In response, Lothian argued that the deal would help resolve the Royal Navy's pressing shortage of destroyers and draw the United States closer to the United Kingdom by creating what was in effect a joint Anglo-American defense of the New World with the US Navy and Army Air Force using British naval and air bases. Lothian also pointed out that the political advantage of the destroyers-for-bases deal, namely if the British were willing to give up their bases in the Caribbean Sea, Bermuda, and Newfoundland to protect the United States in exchange for 50 elderly destroyers, it would encourage US reciprocity in further aid for Britain.

Churchill told the Canadian prime minister William Lyon Mackenzie King: "We must be careful not to let the Americans view too complacently the prospect of a British collapse out of which they would get the British fleet and the guardianship of the British empire minus Great Britain". On 6 June 1940, Churchill in a dispatch to Washington told Lothian to tell Roosevelt that his government would not sign an armistice with Germany and to warn Roosevelt that if the Reich conquered the United Kingdom, a "Quisling government" would be installed in London that would hand over the Royal Navy's ships to Germany.

Churchill had initially felt it was a one-sided transaction and the first step towards the United States taking over the British colonies in the New World, but the shortage of destroyers and the need to draw the United States deeper into a pro-Allied neutrality left him with no real choice and in August he came around to being an enthusiastic supporter and told Lothian to "go full steam ahead" with the bases for destroyers swap.

Churchill's initial hesitation was understandable as he had been very concerned earlier in the summer about the prospect of a German conquest of Great Britain as the outcome of the on-going Battle of Britain was still undecided, and in the event of a German conquest, he planned to take the Royal Navy to the New World to continue the struggle. In this regard, the American demand to take over British naval bases in the Americas had troubled Churchill.

However Lothian advised Churchill that his notion that Roosevelt would ask Congress for a declaration of war if he was reelected to a third term in November 1940 had no basis in fact, saying that at most Roosevelt would maintain a pro-Allied neutrality and that moreover the still overwhelmingly Isolationist Congress would not declare war on Germany simply because Roosevelt had submitted such a request.

=== Destroyers-for-bases ===
Lothian knew however to get the badly needed destroyers in an election year would be a very difficult task to pull off with an Isolationist Congress and the need to somehow get around the US's Neutrality Acts. He would need all the help he could get from influential Americans to persuade President Roosevelt in the first place. His man in New York Aubrey 'Niel' Morgan had introduced Lothian to the influential members of the Century Group, an informal pro-British interventionist group of wealthy businessmen and journalists in the United States, who supported Lothian's efforts. Admiral Harold Stark, had testified before Congress that the old destroyers should be refitted in defence of the US. Congress had subsequently outlawed the transfer of surplus ships unless the Navy had stated they were not needed by the United States. It placed Stark in an awkward situation. Three influential Century Group members went to see the President who had just been renominated by the Democratic Party to run for president for a third term. Roosevelt was reluctant but ultimately suggested he would consider it if the revered American World War I hero General John Pershing could be persuaded to give a broadcast in favour of the destroyers deal but Roosevelt would deny ever suggesting it if it led back to him.

The seventy-five-year-old Pershing, although in Walter Reed hospital, had been waiting to be called upon. Although he thought America should be a participant in the war herself, rather than have other people fight her battles, he agreed to address the nation on the importance of the destroyer transfer. The influential American journalist and commentator Walter Lippmann, a close friend of Pershing and Lothian, prepared a draft of the broadcast for him. In his broadcast on 1 August 1940 Pershing said that " I am telling you tonight before it is too late... " and went on to say that the British Navy needs destroyers to convoy merchant ships and that the US had immense reserves of destroyers and it would be a failure of Americans' duty if they were not provided.

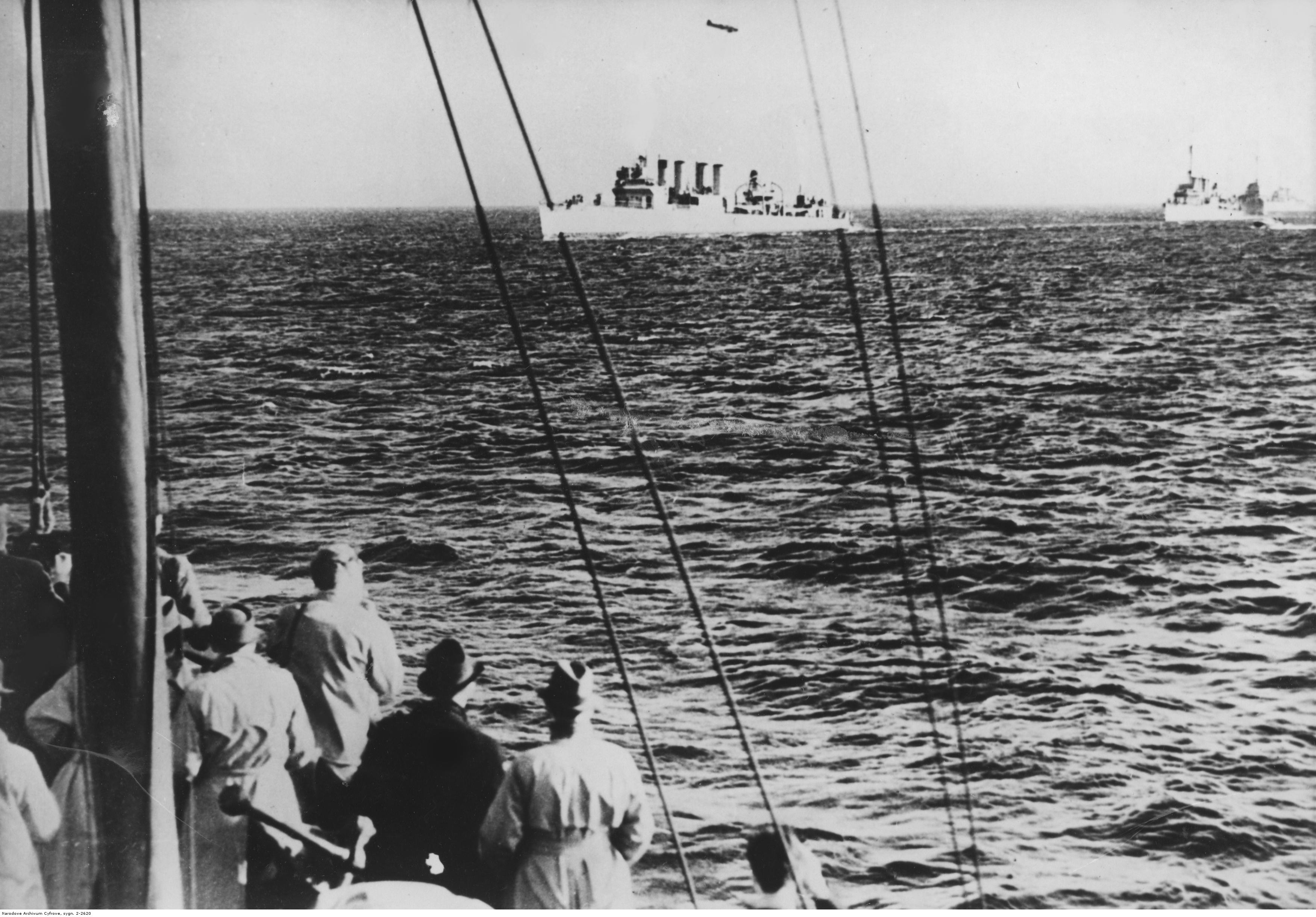
Transferred US destroyers under the destroyers-for-bases deal entering British port, October 1940

Pershing was supported by high ranking retired naval officers. The broadcast was a turning point.

Roosevelt, asked Lothian in early August to take up the idea of British military bases for the destroyers with his government, unaware that Lothian was behind all these vital moves.

However, there was one more guarantee, in that Presidential election year, with Roosevelt seeking an unprecedented third term, that the President was hoping could be obtained. That was that his formidable Republican opponent, Wendell Willkie, would not make destroyers for Britain an election issue. Willkie, a non-isolationist and an interventionist Republican, who had advocated for aid to Britain, said he could not publicly advocate for the destroyer transfer as his party was divided on the issue but at the same time Willkie gave his word (to be given directly to Roosevelt) not to raise it as an election issue and that he would not attack the deal once it was announced. He gave the same undertaking to Lothian. With Willkie's undertakings the seemingly impossible obstacles had been almost finally cleared.

(Ironically it was to Willkie that a re-elected Roosevelt gave a message to take to Churchill that resulted in Churchill's "Give us the tools and we will finish the job" broadcast.)

On 3 September, two months before the Presidential election vote, the improbable mid-election Destroyers-for-Bases Agreement was announced by the Commander-in-Chief, President Roosevelt, through Executive Order (after it was arranged that he had received leading legal advice that it was constitutional). In announcing it the President put emphasis on the bases and the security newly acquired for the United States. It also turned out to be a popular agreement, despite the earlier concerns to the contrary, although it took courage from Roosevelt, who thought he might lose the election over it, and from Willkie to keep his word in spite of outcry from some in his party. Lothian helped with the favourable reception with his extensive press and other contacts. For beleaguered Britain it bought the vital time that was needed for it to hold out so eventually it could act as the critical staging ground for the Allies' liberation of Europe and the ultimate defeat of Hitler.

Churchill subsequently wrote of his ambassador during the critical days of that early summer:

' As the tension of events mounted, not only did Lothian develop a broad comprehension of the scene, but his eye penetrated deeply.'

=== Lend-Lease ===
It was Lothian who found the way to address the interests of the United States so President Roosevelt could get around the US Neutrality Acts. In Britain's hour of need he devised the further concept of the Lend-Lease scheme (including the earlier Destroyers-for-Bases Agreement, The Atlantic Charter and the later handover of military control of Iceland from Britain to the US, defending the route the Canadian and US conveys to Britain followed).

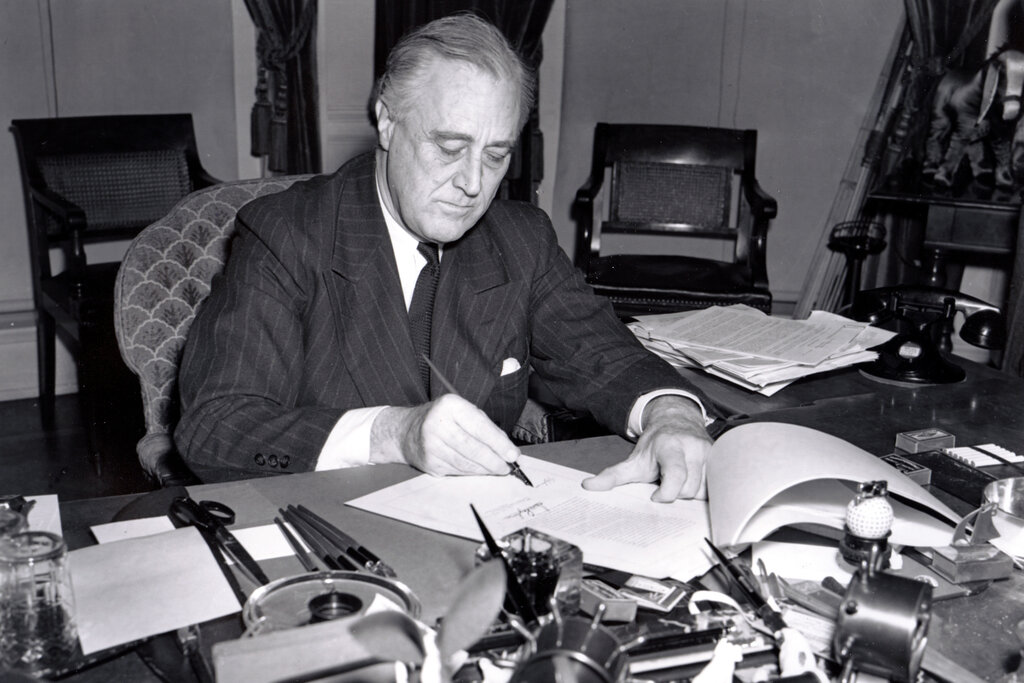
President Franklin D. Roosevelt signs the Lend-Lease Bill - 1941

Churchill and Lothian worked out the details and Lothian took them to Roosevelt. Congress shortly after Lothian's death passed the Act to Promote the Defense of the United States incorporating this means of payment for vital armaments and supplies to Britain, which became known as “Lend-Lease”. It had Britain lease bases on its overseas territories to the US for the US's own defense in return for the US “lending”, aircraft and ships and sending "surplus" or "obsolete" armaments to a beleaguered and financially crippled Britain who then stood alone with the British Commonwealth as the only bulwark against Hitler and the evil of his Nazi creed and invasion forces.

In the summer of 1940, Lothian served as the main British negotiator for the destroyers-for-bases deal. Roosevelt was concerned that if he was seen as too generous with the British that if might hamper his chances of being reelected, and as result, the Americans drove a hard bargain, saying the American people would only support the deal if the British made all the concessions.

Churchill described the lend-lease Bill to Parliament later as:

" the most unsordid act in the history of any nation. "

He wrote

' Once it was accepted by Congress it transformed immediately the whole position. It made us free to shape by agreement long-term plans of vast extent for all our needs. There was no formal provision for repayment ... What we had was lent or leased to us because our continued resistance to the Hitler tyranny was deemed to be of vital interest to the great Republic. According to President Roosevelt, the defence of the United States and not dollars was henceforth to determine where American weapons were to go.' Winston Churchill

=== Visit home ===
Lothian was by now very tired but no controversy was expected until after the US presidential election of November 1940 and so Lothian took the opportunity to fly home on the only trans-Atlantic aircraft, the weekly Clipper flying boat via Lisbon to have personal discussions with Churchill and see for himself the situation in Britain.

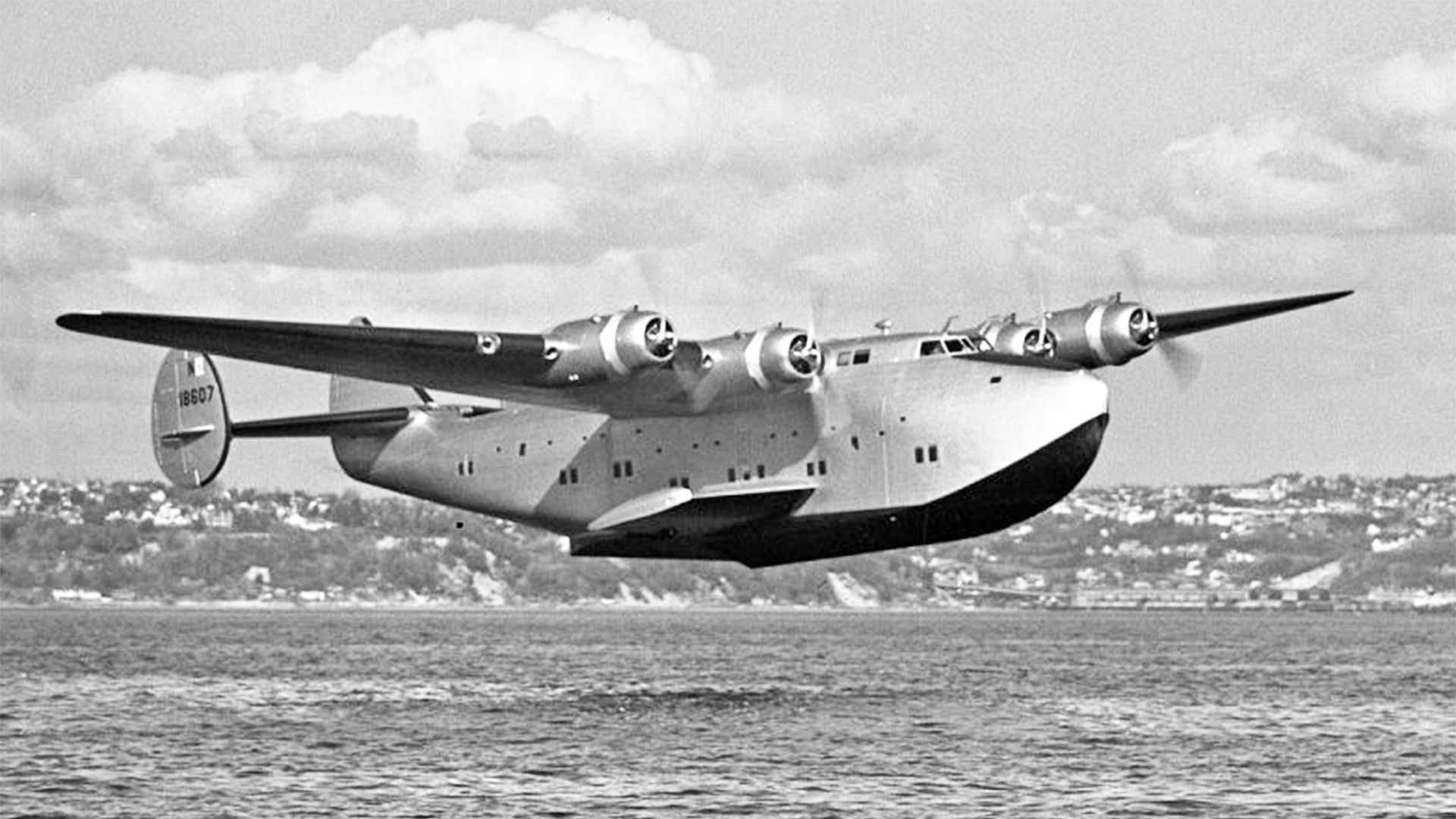
Lothian flew to Britain return on the Boeing Clipper

In his London hotel he got a first-hand experience of the Blitz, when the furniture was blown across the floor of his bedroom. He managed to pay short visits to his homes Monteviot and Blickling to deal with estate matters (as the RAF was billeted at Blickling he had more comfortable soft furnishings brought down from the attics to make the men more comfortable). He managed to go to the Astors' Cliveden for what was to be his final meeting with the Round Table Moot where he stressed the fundamental new fact of the interdependence of the US and the British Commonwealth. He was otherwise consumed with official work throughout.

During his absence President Roosevelt was reelected for a third term of four years on 4 November 1940.

While home King George VI invested Lothian as a Knight of the Thistle, the most distinguished Scottish Order of Knighthood on 12 November 1940 . The order consisted of the sovereign and sixteen knights, as well as certain ' knight ' members of the British royal family. The sovereign alone grants membership of the order; the sovereign is not advised by the government; as occurs with most other orders but Churchill would have been pleased.

Lothian met with Churchill in mid-November for a weekend spent at Ditchley Park, where Churchill often stayed during the war for weekend meetings. They had a lot of ground to cover of great importance.

Churchill later wrote of that weekend together:

' Lothian seemed to me a changed man. In all the years I had known him he had given me the impression of high intellectual and aristocratic detachment from public affairs. Airey, light, aloof, dignified, censorious, yet in a light and gay manner, Lothian had always been good company. Now, under the same hammer that smote us all, I found an earnest, deeply-stirred man. He was primed with every aspect and detail of the American attitude. He won nothing but goodwill and confidence in Washington by his handling of the Destroyers-for-Bases negotiations. He was fresh from intimate contact with the president, with whom he had established a warm personal friendship. '

Lothian's mind turned to the Dollar Problem. Finance and the continuing ability to pay for munitions was now a pressing problem.

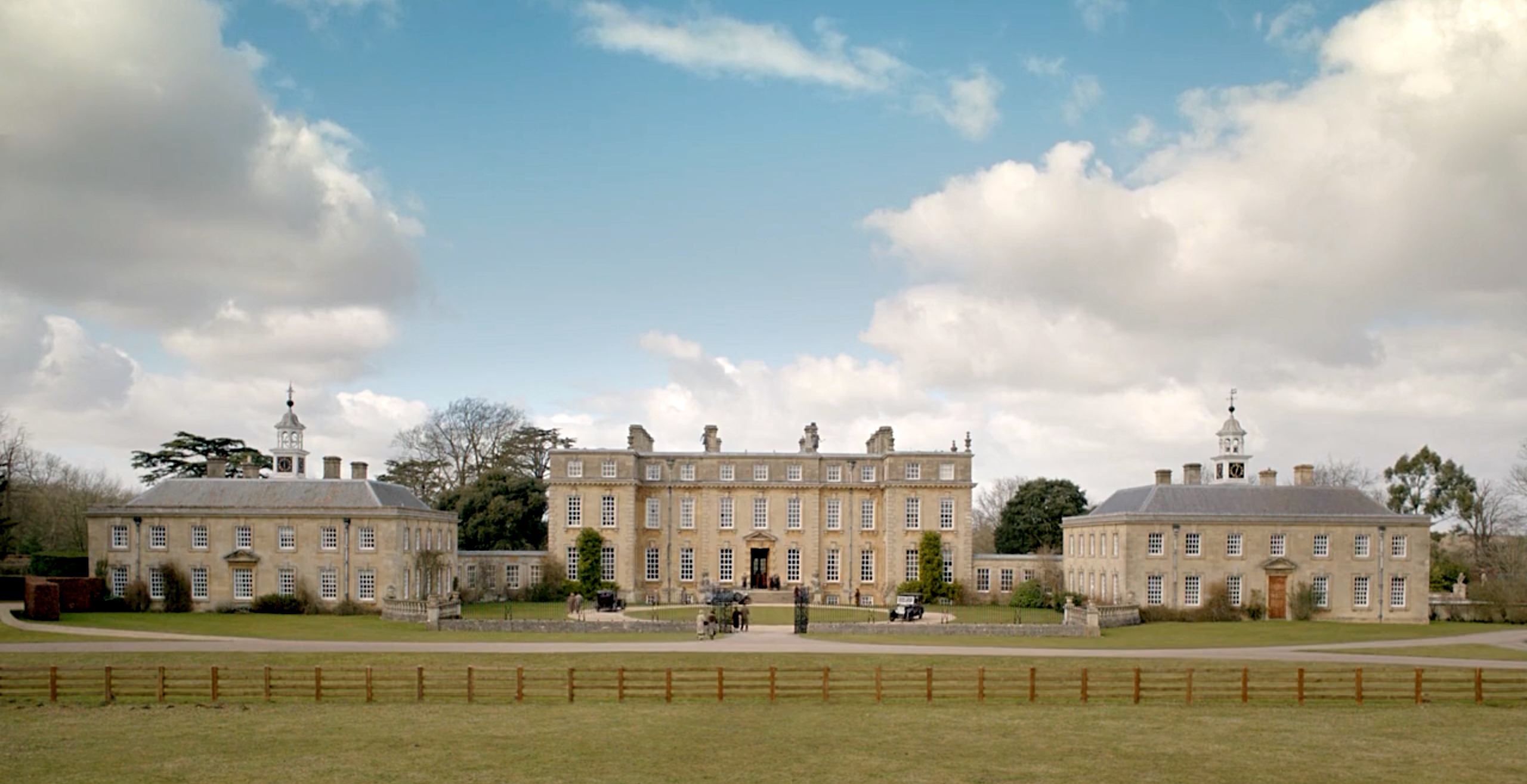
Ditchley Park

Churchill wrote that Lothian ' was confident that the President and his advisors were earnestly seeking the best way to help us. ' Lothian urged Churchill to make Britain's situation plain to Roosevelt, in the hope that a personal letter doing so would force the latter into action to help Britain, and also in the process to ensure the future security of the United States. It had been intended that Lothian take the letter back with him but the need to consult government departments meant it was not ready - in fact not until 7 December.

Lothian's Clipper return was delayed by a week in Lisbon and he was grateful for the enforced holiday and he landed New York on 23 November 1940.

On his return from his discussions with Churchill in Britain, knowing the British financial problem was so severe, he decided while delayed in Lisbon that he felt it was not enough that the President and his advisors should know that Britain was near the end of its financial resources. He trusted the American people and thought that they should be taken into Britain's confidence to add to the pressure and felt there was no time to be lost. Stepping off the Clipper to New York on 23 November 1940, he told the assembled journalists: "Well, boys, Britain's broke; it's your money we want". The near-bankruptcy of the United Kingdom had been a closely guarded secret, and Lothian went well beyond Prime Minister Winston Churchill's instructions in divulging it. Lothian's ' calculated indiscretion ' helped, however, to force President Franklin Roosevelt's hand in responding to British appeals by supporting the Lend-Lease Program to aid Britain.

The Battle of Britain won by British and Commonwealth pilots and volunteer pilots from other nations including some from the United States had had an important effect on US public opinion.

Lothian was then able to initiate conversations that would ultimately become a turning point; a joint Anglo-American military organisation: the Combined Chiefs of Staff.

== American speeches ==
In his speeches to the American people, Lothian portrayed Nazi Germany as a ruthless power bent upon world domination, and to ease American discomfort at British imperialism, noted that the British Empire was evolving into the Commonwealth. Lothian made point of emphasizing that members of the Commonwealth were not under British control, giving the example of Ireland which had declared neutrality, and stated that nations such as Australia, New Zealand, South Africa and Canada were at war because they had chosen to enter the war.

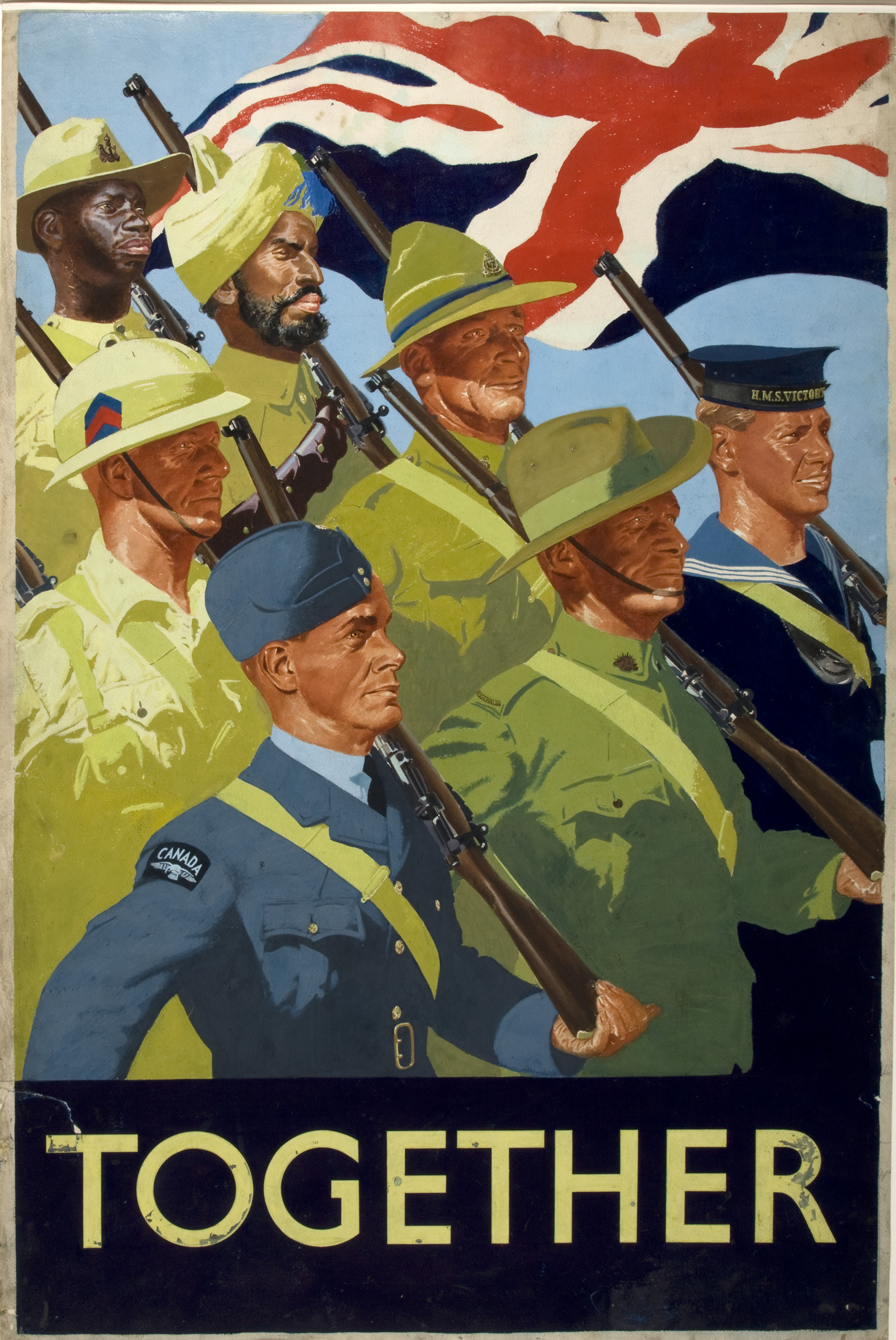
Commonwealth and British Empire forces fighting together. Ministry of Information poster

About the charge that India and the rest of the British colonies around the world had no say in whether they wanted to be involved in the war, Lothian stated these colonies would be granted Dominion status in due course once they were "ready". The fact that Lothian had been an advocate of granting Dominion status to India made him sound credible on this issue to American audiences, though Churchill had no intention of granting India Dominion status. Finally, Lothian depicted democracy as a special value of the English-speaking peoples, claiming that democracy had been born in ancient Athens, nourished in Rome, developed into maturity in Britain and had finally reached perfection in the United States. In a ceremony performed at the Library of Congress, Lothian placed one of the first versions of the Magna Carta produced in 1215 at the library as a gift from the people of Britain to the people of the United States to illustrate their common democratic heritage. In his speech, Lothian declared that he placed this copy of the Magna Carta "alongside its own descendants, the Declaration of Independence and the American constitution".

Lothian was greatly influenced by the navalist theories of the American historian Alfred Thayer Mahan put forward in his 1890 book The Influence of Sea Power Upon History, and he frequently cited Mahan's thesis that whatever power was the greatest sea power was also the world's greatest power. Lothian claimed that the United States had benefitted from the Pax Britannica of the 19th century as he maintained that the Royal Navy had protected the United States just as much as the United Kingdom during the "short 19th century" of 1815–1914. Using Mahan's theories as his basis, Lothian claimed that a Germany that dominated the seas would inevitably come into conflict with the United States, and thereby reversed the arguments of American isolationists by claiming the best way to keep the United States out of the war was by aiding Britain. Lothian claimed that as long as Britain dominated the seas, there was no prospect of a German-American war, thereby making aiding Britain the best way of the United States to avoid entering the war.

In a speech in Chicago, Lothian stated that the Royal Navy was the United States' "first line of defense", saying that as long the Royal Navy ruled the seas there was no danger of a German invasion of anywhere in the New World. Lothian noted that Germany had emerged as a major economic competitor to the United States in Latin America, and argued that if Britain were defeated, then the Monroe Doctrine would become moot as he envisioned a future where the Kriegsmarine ruled the Atlantic, allowing the Reich to project power anywhere it wanted in Latin America. Lothian's choice of Chicago to deliver this speech was no accident. The American Midwest was a stronghold of isolationism, and Lothian chose Chicago as a way to reach an audience that was particularly opposed to American aid to Britain. Cadogan and the other professional diplomats at the Foreign Office objected to the Chicago speech, saying that speeches like the one he delivered in Chicago would lead to charges of British inference in the American presidential election. Lothian in response wrote that his speeches "have been a success here precisely because I have felt that I knew the American mind well enough to be quite frank and to deal frankly with controversial issues. I can imagine what my speeches would have been like if they had been minuted by all the veterans of the Foreign Office at home!"

In an article in Time, Lothian's Chicago speech was described as:

"one of the most effective, skillful briefs yet delivered for the Allied cause. It was the sort of talk which earns Britain a reputation for fair dealing and open-minded thinking". Time

In a speech to the graduating class at Yale University on 19 June 1940, Lothian stated: "The outcome of the grim struggle will affect you almost as much at it affects us. For if Hitler gets our fleet or destroys it, the whole foundation on which the security of both our countries has rested for 120 years will have disappeared".

=== Combating US Isolationism ===
Lothian did not live to see the day that the US brought their might to join the cause of the Allies as combatants. It was almost exactly a year after his death after the Japanese invasion of Pearl Harbor and the subsequent declaration of War by Hitler on the United States four days later, which killed US Isolationism in a single stroke. No American patriot could now accuse Roosevelt of being responsible for war after war had been declared upon them.

In the meantime Lothian had made it possible for the political Isolationist climate in the US to change and US Interventionism sympathies to grow in support of the Old Lion with her lion cubs at her side by sale and supply of war materials, ammunition, ships and aircraft to keep the struggle alive and so gain the vital time for Britain and the Commonwealth forces to hold out alone until the armed might of the United States joined the European war on that 11 December 1941.

On 19 April 1940 Lothian set out before the St Louis Chamber of Commerce his description of Hitler's Nazi plan:

Hitler's technique of empire-building has been simple. He set out first of all to create the model war state. He concentrated all political power in the hands of himself and the leaders of his National Socialist Party. He introduced conscription in its most complete and universal form. He organized the whole youth of Germany and indoctrinated them in a set of horrible dogmas, such as the cult of blood and soil, the nobility of war and sacrifice, the vileness of the Jews and the worship of the German racial state. This gave him a steadily increasing proportion of German people wholly conditioned to his leadership. He took charge of the press, publishing, and propaganda and undermined the independence and the influence both of the old centres of learning and of religion. He established control over the whole economic life of Germany and organized both people and industry at tremendous speed, for a single purpose, war. His strategic theory as set out in Mein Kampf, is simple. Hitler was convinced that he could create in the centre of Europe a single, disciplined, entirely militarized state of 80,000,000 Germans, obedient to a single dynamic will, using its gigantic power, backed by diplomatic deception and intrigue, with utter ruthlessness, nothing would prevent Nazified Germany from conquering, or dominating and economically exploiting, its neighbours one by one, until he controlled Europe, and in the end the greater part of the world, as Rome had dominated the civilized world.

On 19 July 1940, Hitler in a speech put out peace feelers to Britain. Lothian asked Malcolm Lovell, an American Quaker in touch with the Germans, to inquire what terms were on offer. There were then seven overrun Governments in Exile in Britain at the time; Czechoslovakia, Poland, Norway, Holland, Belgium, Luxembourg and the self appointed representative of free France, General Charles de Gaulle. However, on 22 July, Foreign Secretary Lord Halifax delivered a speech rejecting the offer. Harold Nicolson, a long time past critic of Lothian's earlier attempts at avoiding another war, wrote in a somewhat intemperate edited entry in his diary, ' Philip Lothian telephones wildly from Washington in the evening begging Halifax not to say anything in his broadcast tonight which would close the door to peace. Lothian claims that he knows the peace terms and they are most satisfactory. I am glad to say that Halifax pays no attention to this and makes an extremely bad broadcast but one that is perfectly firm as far as it goes '. This is a somewhat perplexing entry given what Lothian was advising as Ambassador that Britain should not agree to any armistice with Germany.

From 1937 onward, Britain had leaned in a pro-Chinese neutrality with regard to the Second Sino-Japanese War. In July 1940, when the Japanese submitted an ultimatum demanding that the British close the Burma Road under which arms were carried from India to China, Lothian supported accepting the Japanese demand. Churchill accepted the Japanese ultimatum and had the Burma road closed, though the British re-opened the Burma Road in October 1940. For a time, Lothian favoured making an agreement with Japan under which Britain would recognize China as being within the Japanese sphere of influence and agree to supply Japan with oil in exchange for a Japanese promise not to align any more closer with Germany and Italy.

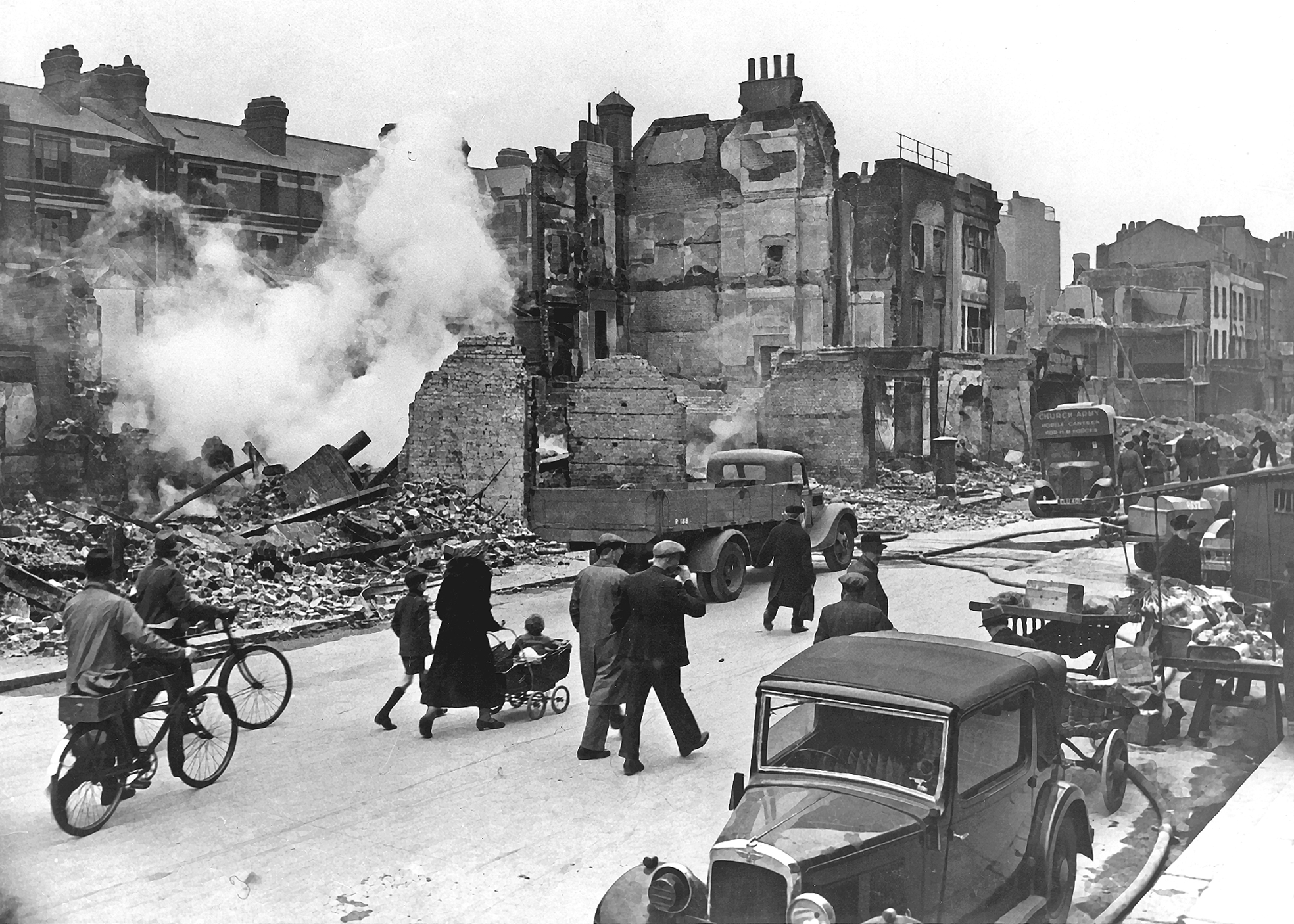
London bombed; Londoners carry on

During a dinner party at the British embassy on 18 July 1940 with Treasury Secretary Henry Morgenthau Jr. and the War Secretary Henry L. Stimson, Lothian became involved in a debate with the American guests criticising the British for closing the Burma road, leading Lothian to respond that the Americans had offered Britain no support when the Japanese ultimatum arrived and that furthermore that 80% of all the oil used in Japan came from the United States, saying it was American oil companies who were supporting the Japanese war machine. Lothian stated that Japan had no oil, and if the Americans wanted to they could easily paralyze the Japanese economy with an oil embargo. Lothian then proposed that the United States together with Britain impose a total oil embargo on Japan, and that the British would blow up the oil wells in the Netherlands East Indies (modern Indonesia) to prevent the Japanese from seizing them. Lothian finally dared his American guests to actually do what he had just suggested, saying here was a way to stop Japan.

Morgenthau was much taken with the idea, though Lothian had only made this suggestion in a moment of anger, and the next day advised Roosevelt that the United States should impose an oil embargo on Japan. Though Roosevelt rejected the idea of an oil embargo for the time being following advice from the State Department that the Japanese might very well react to an oil embargo by invading the Netherlands East Indies to seize the oil wells, this was the origin of the oil embargo that the United States, the United Kingdom and the Dutch government-in-exile were to impose on Japan on 26 July 1941. In his report to London, Lothian mentioned he discussed the idea of an oil embargo on Japan, though he notably failed to mention it was he who brought up the idea, giving the highly misleading impression that it was Stimson and Morgenthau who first suggested an oil embargo. Churchill when he read the dispatch called the idea of an oil embargo on Japan "madness". Though Lothian tried to back away from an idea he himself had first floated, but his unwillingness to have British policy become too far removed from American policy made his resistance half-hearted.

With regard to Japan, British policy was torn between a belief that being too confrontational would lead to the Japanese seizing the British colonies in Asia vs. a fear that being out of sync with American policy would cause tensions in Anglo-American relations at a time when Britain desperately needed the help of the United States against Germany.

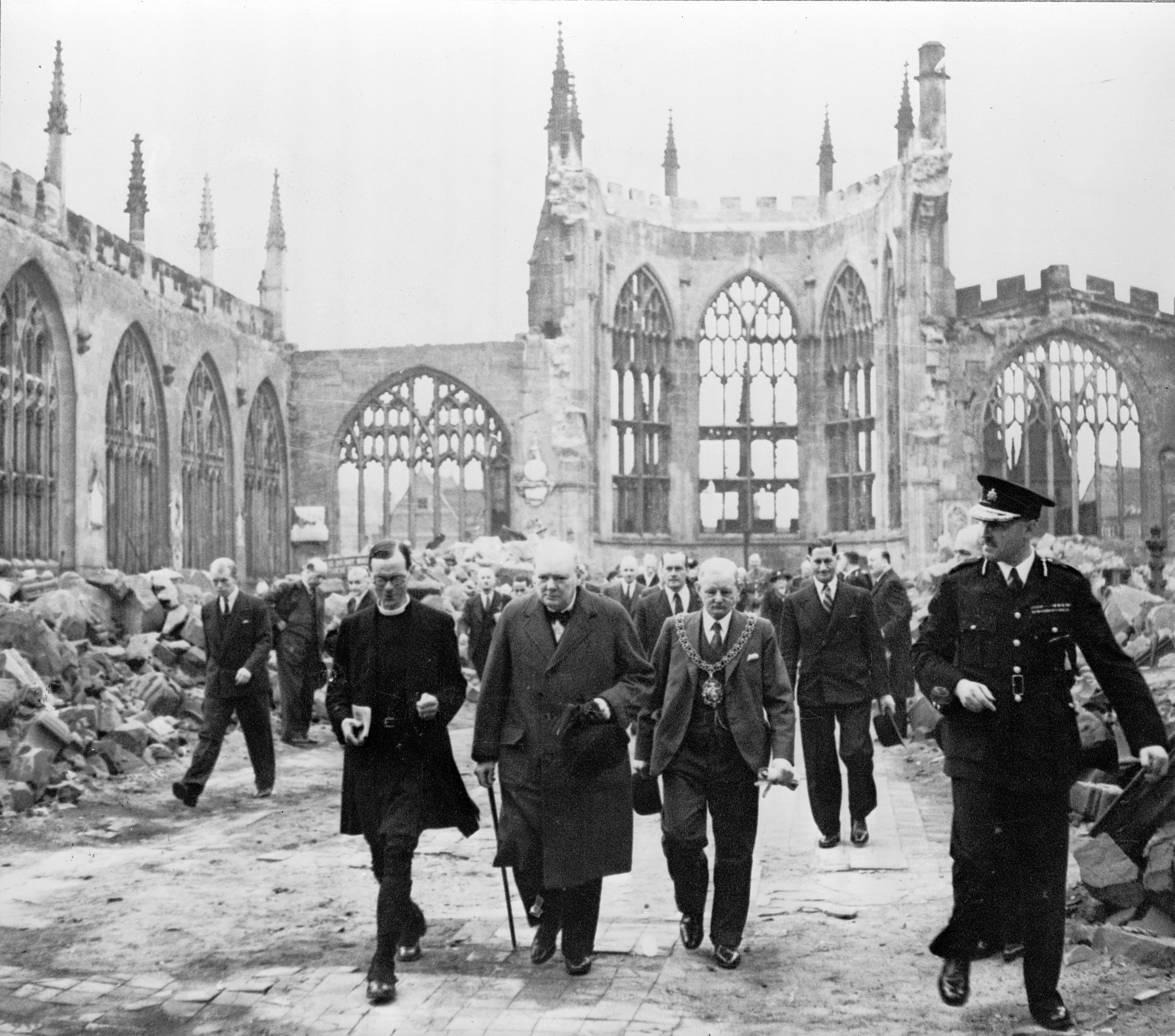
Churchill after the bombing of Coventry inspecting its cathedral's damage, November, 1940

=== His final speech ===
Lothian's last speech was delivered when Britain and the Commonwealth stood alone. The speech was delivered to the American Farm Bureau Federation at Baltimore on 11 December 1940. This was after the fall of France and just after the Battle of Britain had drawn to a close. This battle, waged in the air by the RAF, RCAF and other pilots of the British Commonwealth countries and even the volunteer pilots from the United States, before their country had officially joined the conflict, is famously memorialised by Churchill simply as " never was so much owed by so many to so few." The roll of honour for the Battle of Britain recognises 595 non-British pilots (out of 2,936) These included 145 Poles, 127 New Zealanders, 112 Canadians, 88 Czechoslovaks, 10 Irish, 32 Australians, 28 Belgians, 25 South Africans, 13 French, 9 Americans, 3 Southern Rhodesians and individuals from Jamaica, Barbados and the then Dominion of Newfoundland.

Lothian took great care in writing this speech but it was read for him by his senior official, as he was too ill to deliver it himself. The speech in this abbreviated form was the last time he was to convey his message as effectively as he had been doing to Britain's American friends and future wartime allies:

It is now nearly five months since I made a public speech in the United States. Since then I have been home to consult with my Government and find out for myself how things were going in Britain...

In the last five months there have been terrific changes. When I last spoke we had experienced a terrific shock - the overthrow of France. Hitler seemed irresistible. First Poland had been overwhelmed; then Norway; then Holland; then Belgium. Finally came the destruction in less than a month's fighting of what had been rated the finest army for its size in Europe, the disarmament and division of France.

If you recall those dismal days you will remember there was something like despair among many diplomatic and business circles in Washington, New York and other cities of the United States. What could be the future of civilization if France, that beautiful child of Liberty, had erased the rights of man...defined in those three immortal words, 'Liberté, Egalité, Fraternité’, from her escutcheon?

Further Hitler had announced that he would dictate peace in London in August, or at the latest September. And hadn't he always been right over his military dates?

...Wasn't it certain that England was going to be conquered and that, with Hitler's crossing of the channel the end of the British Commonwealth would come?

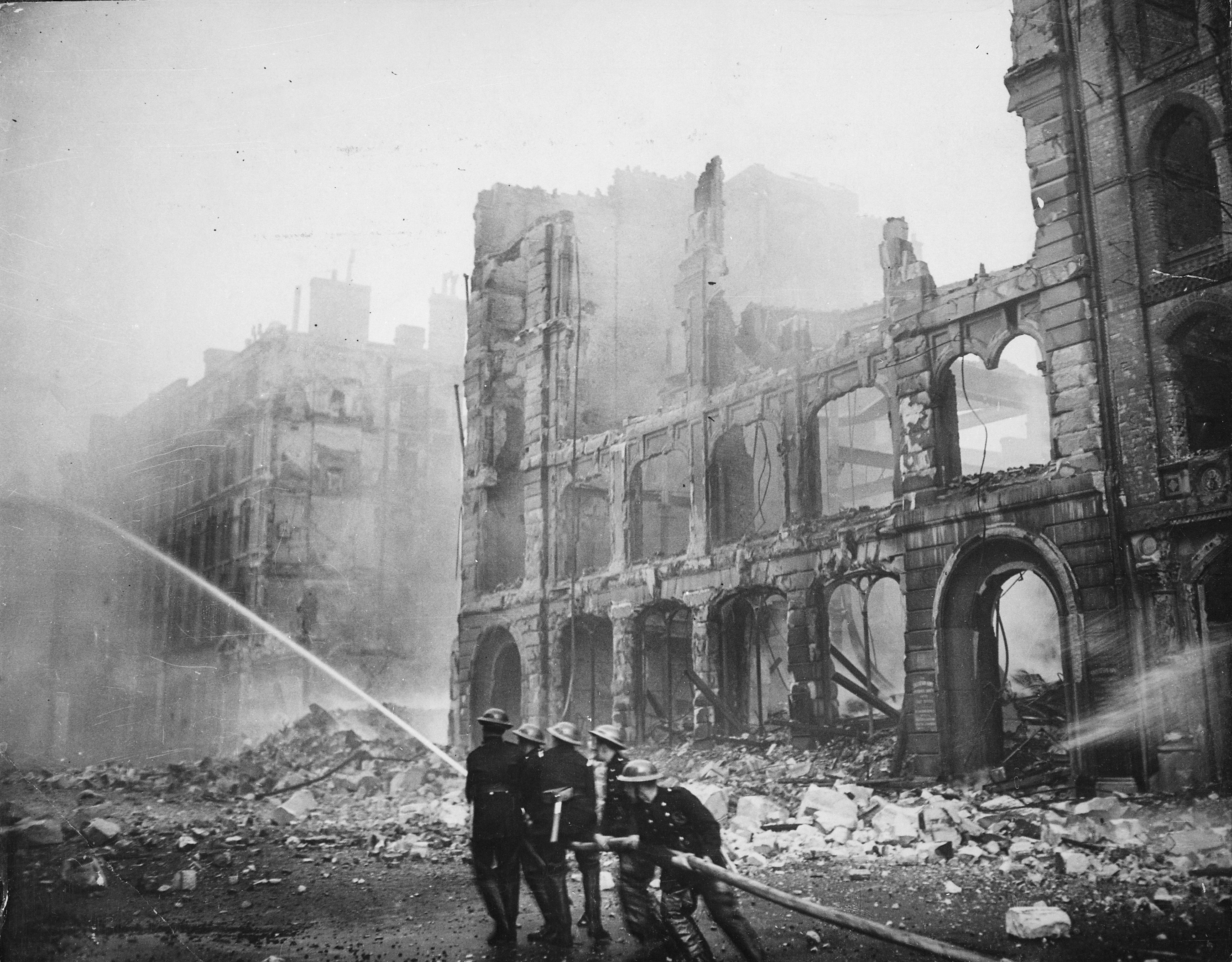
Firemen fighting the London fires ignited by the Blitz

If these were gloomy prophesies in circulation about us, there were hardly less gloomy speculations about the future of the United States. If Hitler conquered Britain, the British fleet would be sunk or surrendered or scattered among British nations overseas. Yet wasn't it clear that American security required two fleets - the British Fleet based in Britain blocking entry of hostile European fleets into the Eastern Atlantic, and the United States Fleet predominant in the Pacific?

It was this dual system which protected the Monroe Doctrine and which alone could keep war distant from American shores...

But that grim picture has been dispelled, at any rate for the present, by the action of the people of a small island in the North Sea, nobly and valiantly aided by the young nations of the British family across the seas.

First there was Dunkirk.... Then came Mr. Winston Churchill, with almost the whole rest of the world on the run, standing undaunted in the breach, defying...Hitler and National Socialism, and inviting his fellow countrymen not to appeasement or retreat but to resistance at the price of blood, suffering, sweat and tears.... Then followed the great air battles of August and September in which the Germans lost nearly 200 machines in a day and five to six to one in pilots. Then came the brutal bombing of London and especially East London by night. Few people realize what an inferno that was. The first attack set great fires alight so that hour after hour and night after night the German bombers could return...[with] fresh cargoes of destruction to unload on the stricken people of Dockland.

But there was no flinching before Hitler's attempted intimidation, no crying for peace, no suggestion that, though we were almost alone, we had had enough. Simple victims, blown from hearth and home, declared they would stick it if only others did and it led to victory. Air raid wardens, men and women fire fighters, police, doctors and nurses and the voluntary services worked on hour after hour, day after day, amid fires and the crashing of bombs with heavy casualties until they had rescued and tended the wounded, fought down the flames, and by resources of the barrage and other devices had brought bombing under some control... And finally, has come the gradual petering out of the much heralded invasion of Britain. That invasion was really broken in great air battles....

Thus if Hitler won the first round of the great battle in Norway in April we have won the second. For without the conquest of Britain Hitler cannot win the war.

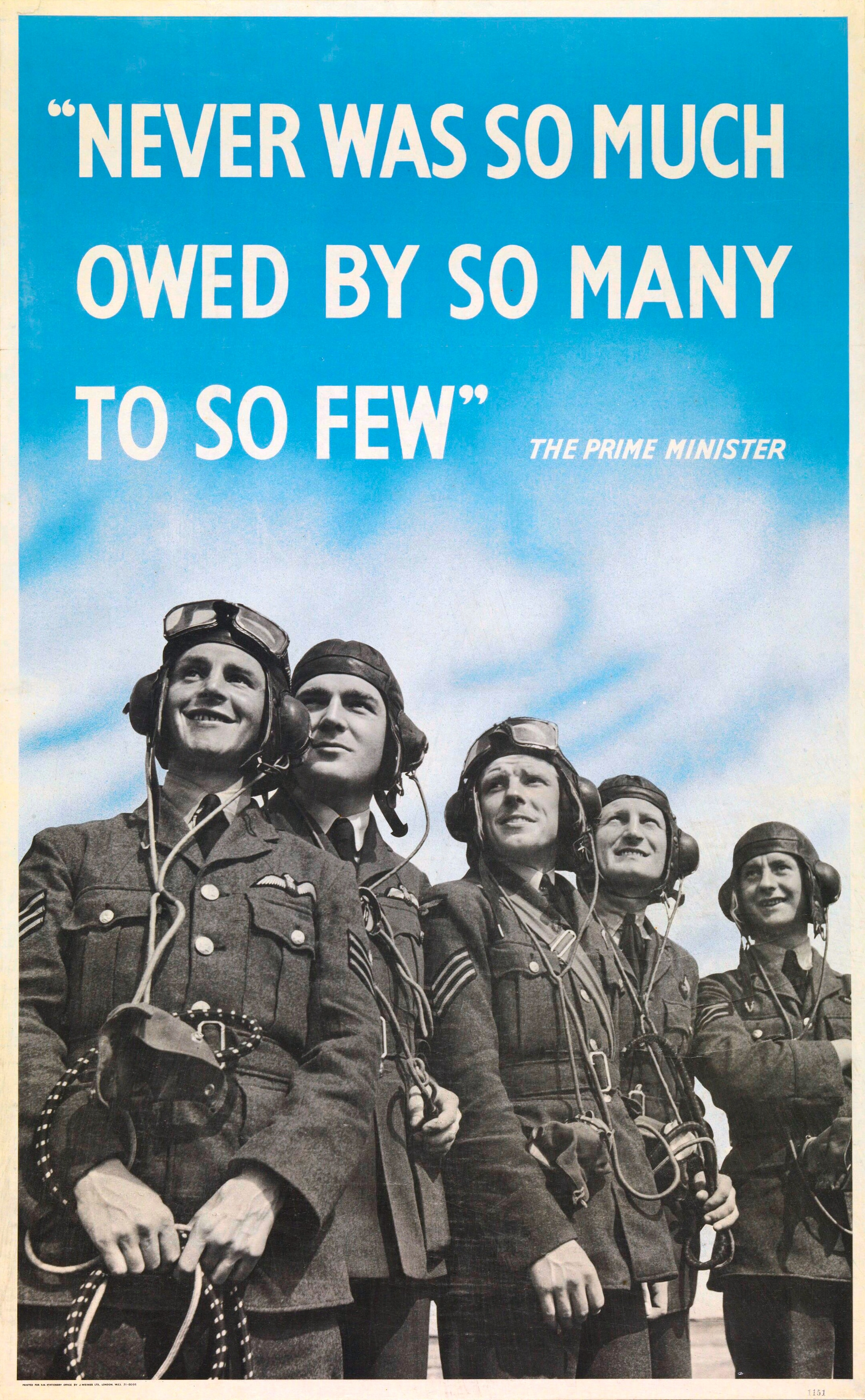
Ministry of Information poster.

But the war is not yet won. Do not think that Hitler's Nazidom is going to be easily overthrown. Hitler is certainly going to make a second attempt next year.

The danger of course springs ultimately from the fact that whereas in the last war we had the support of the Japanese, Italian and French Navies, and after April 1917 of your Navy, today, since the disappearance of the powerful French Navy, we are fighting alone. Our Navy therefore, with tremendous tasks, which rest on it, none of which it has shirked or evaded, is strung out terribly thin.

We think that this is a situation that concerns you almost as much as it concerns us. It has long been clear that your security no less than ours depends upon us holding the Atlantic impregnable and you the Pacific...

We have both, therefore, a vital interest in decisively defeating the now rapidly maturing naval attack on British communications. It is the best way of preventing a spread of the war. And an essential step towards that victory...is the uninterrupted flow of American munitions to the British Isles...

“But we are not in the least dismayed. With help from you we are confident we can win...We are confident first of all for spiritual reasons. The core of Hitlerism is moral rottenness and the belief that the use of utter brutality [and] ruthless power and the prosecution of domination is the road to greatness both in individuals and nations. Hitlerism is a tragedy in Germany. Its doctrine is not true. All history proves it wrong. The Sermon on the Mount is in the long run much stronger than all Hitler's propaganda or Goering's guns and bombs.

The core of the Allied creed for all our mistakes of omission and commission, is liberty, justice, and truth, and that we believe, will infallibly prevail if we have resolution and the courage to resist to the end...

I have done. I have endeavoured to give you some idea of our present position and dangers, the problems of 1941, and our hopes for the future. It is for you to decide whether you share our hopes and what support you will give us in realizing them. We are, I believe, doing all we can. Since May there is no challenge we have evaded, no challenge we have refused. If you back us you won't be backing a quitter. The issue now depends largely on what you decide to do. Nobody can share that responsibility with you. It is the great strength of democracy that it brings responsibility down squarely on every citizen and every nation. And before the judgement seat of God each must answer for his own actions.

== Death ==
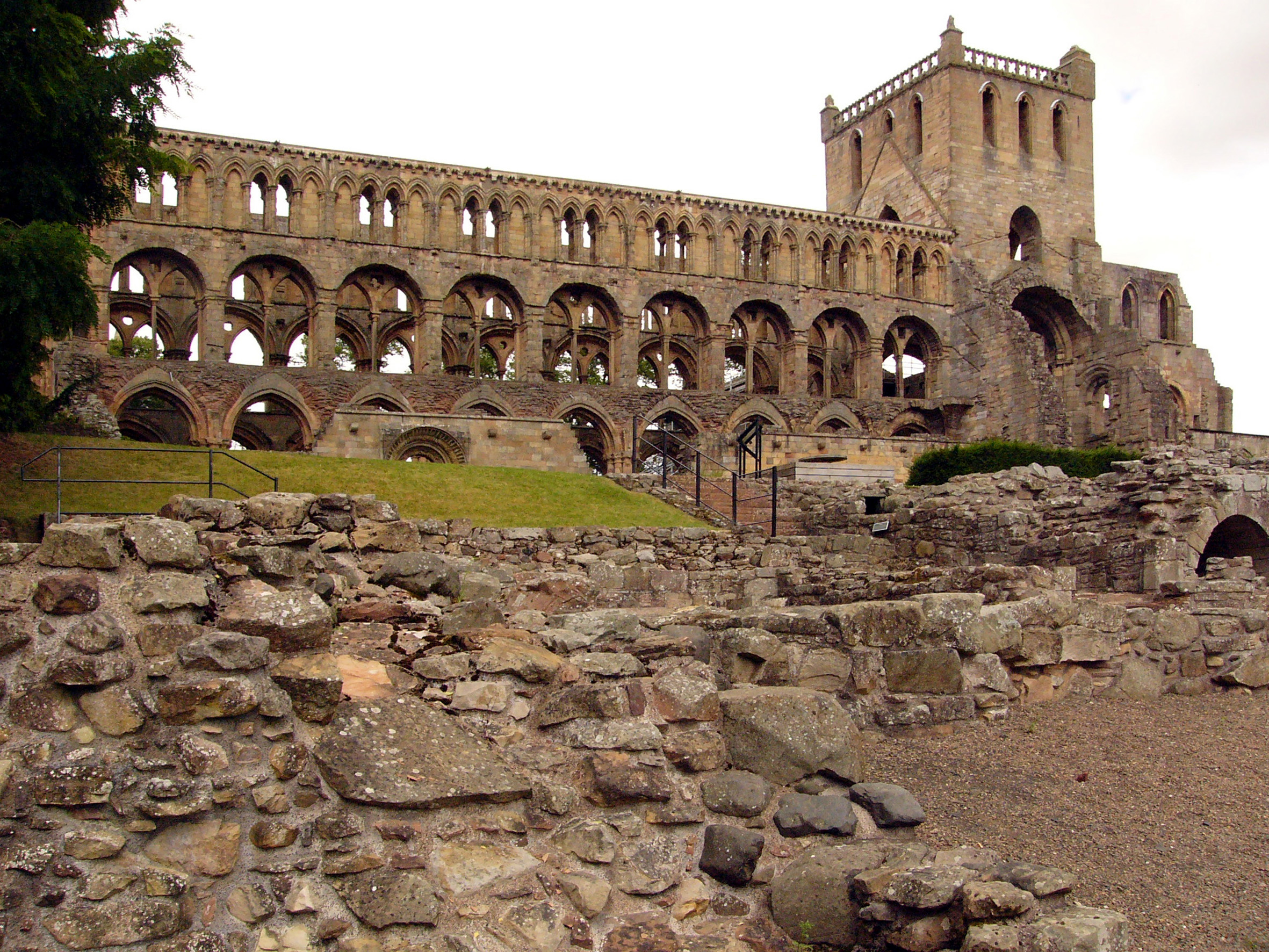
Jedburgh Abbey from the South

Lothian died the next night, 12 December 1940, aged 58, at the Washington Embassy. Devoted to the very end to the religion to which he had converted, he died having refused medical treatment as a Christian Scientist. His death was met by a large outpouring of tributes from across the United States and in Britain.

His unexpected death came as a stunning blow to both America and Britain. President Roosevelt wrote to George VI of his sorrow and shock as "beyond measure" at the passing of "my old friend".

The United States government accorded him a state funeral at the Washington National Cathedral on the following Sunday, 14 December 1940. His ashes were deposited with accompanying ceremony the next day at Arlington National Cemetery in the Maine Mast Memorial to rest there until after the War.

In Britain tributes were paid to him in Parliament by all party leaders, cabinet and members of both the House of Commons and the House of Lords, including Churchill, Attlee, Lloyd George and Halifax. A large national memorial service was held for him in Westminster Abbey on 20 December 1940.

British prime minister Winston Churchill claimed on behalf of Britain that he was

' Our greatest ambassador to the United States '

Churchill later lamented, ' It was at this moment, the most important in his public career, that Philip Lothian was taken from us. Shortly after his return to Washington he fell suddenly and gravely ill. He worked unremittingly to the end. On 12 December, in the full tide of success, he died. This was a loss to the nation and to the Cause. He was mourned by wide circles of friends on both sided of the ocean. To me, who had been in such intimate contact with him a fortnight before, it was a personal shock. I paid my tribute to him in the House of Commons united in deep respect for his work and memory.'

It was an irreparable loss and as the respected American journalist and commentator Walter Lippmann put it Lothian was "one of the great figures of the war," as the man who came up with the intellectual relationship for Anglo-American cooperation. Thanks to him, Roosevelt had arrived at his modus operandi by which the United States could gradually intervene to save Britain.

With the Battle of the Atlantic making sea travel risky and air travel limited, the United Kingdom had agreed that his ashes should remain in the United States until such time as they might be safely conveyed across the Atlantic.

After the war Lord Lothian's ashes were returned to Scotland with honours aboard an American warship in December 1945. These were buried in the Kerr family vault in the north transept of Jedburgh Abbey."The ancient church whose ruined walls of red sandstone, rising above the clear flowing waters of the Jed, first greet the traveller from the south a few miles after crossing the Border."

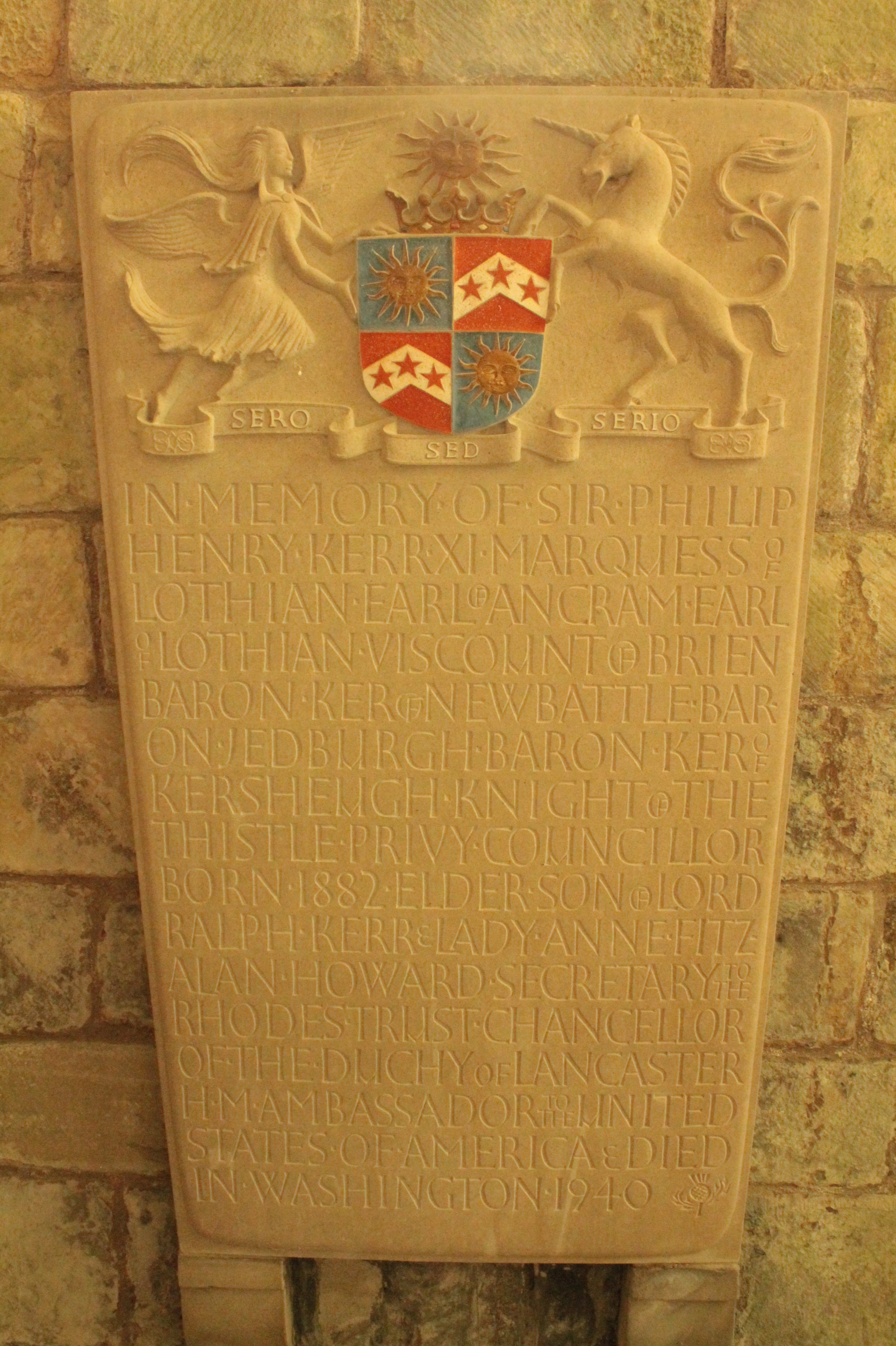
The grave of Philip Henry Kerr, Jedburgh Abbey

== Heirs and bequests ==
Lothian never married and left no direct heirs, so the marquessate was inherited by his first cousin, Peter Kerr who inherited Lothian's Scottish estate Monteviot and Ferniehirst Castle, which he restored and is today occupied by another Kerr descendent.

Lothian, aware heirs could no longer afford to keep up a number of large estates, had bequeathed his Blickling Hall with all its treasures and its 4,500 acre estate in Norfolk on his death to the National Trust (having brought about a change in 1938 in the law allowing the Trust to accept country estates as well as houses so that the National Trust's objectives were significantly expanded.

Lothian had already given in 1937 Newbattle Abbey to the four ancient Scottish Universities, the University of St Andrews, the University of Glasgow, the University of Aberdeen and the University of Edinburgh. in trust for use for adults returning to education and the trust was coveyed to them.

== Bibliography ==
- Anta, Claudio Giulio (September 2014). "Lord Lothian: a far-sighted federalist". Rivista di Studi Politici Internazionali. 323 (3): 417–432.
- Ascher, Abraham (2012). Was Hitler a Riddle? Western Democracies and National Socialism. Stanford: Stanford University Press. ISBN 9780804784597.
- Billington Jr, David P. Lothian Philip Kerr and the Quest for World Order (2006)
- Bloch, Michael (2015). Closet Queens Some 20th Century British Politicians. Boston: Little, Brown Book Group. ISBN 9781405517010.
- Bosco, A. and A. May, eds. The Round Table movement, the Empire/Commonwealth and British foreign policy (1997)
- Butler, J. R. M. (1960). Lord Lothian (Philip Kerr) 1882-1940. St Martin's Press. ASIN B0007ITY2A.
- Churchill, Winston S. (1949). The Second World War, Volume II, Their Finest Hour , Cassel & Co., London - Toronto - Melbourne - Sydney - Wellington.
- Cowling, Maurice, The Impact of Hitler – British Policies and Policy 1933–1940, (Cambridge UP, 1975), p. 411, ISBN 0-521-20582-4
- Cull, Nicholas (1995). Selling War The British Propaganda Campaign Against American "Neutrality" in World War II. Oxford: Oxford University Press. ISBN 9780195354799.
- Dockrill, Michael (1999). British Establishment Perspectives on France, 1936–40. London: Macmillan. ISBN 9781349273089.
- Dunn, Susan (2013). 1940: FDR, Willkie, Lindbergh, Hitler – the Election amid the Storm. New Haven: Yale University Press.
- Gilbert, Martin (2009). The Routledge Atlas of the Second World War. London: Routledge. ISBN 9780415552899.
- Griffiths, Richard (1980). Fellow Travellers of the Right: British Enthusiasts for Nazi Germany, 1933-1939. London: Faber and Faber. ISBN 0571271324.
- Hodson, H.V., ed. (1939). The British Commonwealth and the Future. (Proceedings of the second unofficial conference on British Commonwealth Relations, Sydney, 3rd-17th September 1938. Oxford University Press. (issued under the auspices of The Royal Institute of International Affairs).
- Jeffreys-Jones, Rhodri. "Lord Lothian and American Democracy: An Illusion in Pursuit of an Illusion." Canadian Review of American Studies 17.4 (1986): 411–422.
- Ketchum, Richard (1989). The Borrowed Years 1938-1941, America on the way to War. New York: Random House. ISBN 0394560116.
- Lavin, Deborah (1995). From Commonwealth to International Empire, A Biography of Lionel Curtis. Oxford: Clarendon Press. ISBN 9780198126164.
- Lehrman, Lewis E. (2017). Churchill, Roosevelt & Company Studies in Character and Statecraft. Mechanicsburg: Stackpole Books. ISBN 9780811765473.
- Macmillan, Margaret (2001). Paris 1919: Six Months That Changed the World. New York: Random House. ISBN 9780307432964.
- May, Alex. "Kerr, Philip Henry, eleventh marquess of Lothian (1882–1940)", Oxford Dictionary of National Biography, Oxford University Press, 2004; online edn, Jan 2011 online
- May, Alexander, The Round Table, 1910–66 DPhil. University of Oxford (1995)
- Nicolson, Harold (1967). Harold Nicolson: Diaries and Letters, 1939-45. London: Collins.
- Olson, Lynne (2013). Those Angry Days: Roosevelt, Lindbergh, and America's Fight over World War II, 1939–1941. New York: Random House. ISBN 9781400069743.
- Olson, Lynne (2017). Last Hope Island. New York: Random House. ISBN 9780812997354.
- Reynolds, David (1983). "Lord Lothian and Anglo-American relations, 1939-1940". Transactions of the American Philosophical Society. 73, part 2 (2). American Philosophical Society: 1–65. doi:10.2307/1006337. JSTOR 1006337. OCLC 76971370.
- Roberts, Priscilla. "Lord Lothian and the Atlantic world." Historian 66.1 (2004): 97-127 online.
- Roberts, Priscilla. Lord Lothian and Anglo-American Relations, 1900-1940 (2009)
- Rofe, Simon (2009). "Lord Lothian, 1939-1940". In Michael Hopkins, John Young and Saul Kelly (ed.). The Washington Embassy British Ambassadors to the United States, 1939–77. London: Macmillian. ISBN 9780230234543.
- Thorpe, D. R. "Eden, (Robert) Anthony, first earl of Avon (1897–1977)", Oxford Dictionary of National Biography (Oxford University Press, 2004) online
- Wortman, Marc (2016). 1941: Fighting the Shadow War – A Divided America in a World at War. New York: Atlantic Monthly Press. ISBN 9780802125118.

=== Primary sources ===
- The American Speeches of Lord Lothian, The Royal Institute of International Affairs, Oxford University Press. London - New York - Toronto (1941)
- J. Pinder and A. Bosco, eds. Pacifism is not enough: collected lectures and speeches of Lord Lothian (1990),

Political offices
| Preceded by The Lord Ponsonby of Shulbrede | Chancellor of the Duchy of Lancaster; August–November 1931 | Succeeded by J. C. C. Davidson |
| Preceded by The Lord Snell | Under-Secretary of State for India; 1931–1932 | Succeeded by Rab Butler |
Diplomatic posts
| Preceded by Sir Ronald Lindsay | British Ambassador to the United States; 1939–1940 | Succeeded by The Viscount Halifax |
Peerage of Scotland
| Preceded by Robert Kerr | Marquess of Lothian; 1930–1940 | Succeeded by Peter Kerr |
