= Betty Lussier =

American WWII aviator and spy

Betty Ann Lussier
- Born: 20 December 1920; Alberta Canada
- Died: 30 November 2017 (aged 96)
- Education: Maryland University
- Occupations: Pilot, OSS operative, Corn farmer and author
- Known for: Flying for the RAF during WWII and then working for the Office of Strategic Services to develop spy routes.

Betty Ann Lussier (20 December 1921 – 30 November 2017) an American female pilot who volunteered to fly for the RAF during WWII, ferrying pilots and planes to assist the war effort. When refused to fly combat missions she quit the RAF and joined the Office of Strategic Services (OSS) helping to set up a chain of double agents in Algeria, Sicily, Italy and France.

== Early life ==
Betty Lussier grew up on the family owned dairy farm on Chesapeake Bay, Maryland with her father, Emile John Lussier who as a decorated WWI fighter pilot, her mother Vera Fleming, a home maker and farmer and her sister Nita.

Lussier attended at the University of Maryland and with her love of flying she joined the Civilian Pilot Training Program (CPTP) which was met with resistance due to her being a woman. The CPTP did allow her to increase her flying hours and techniques and experience which would come in useful later on.

Due to break out of WWII, Lussier dropped out of college to assist with the war effort, she began working the night shift at a local hospital building B-26 bombers. After a short time and at 20 years old Lussier learned of a British initiative that granted free passage to any British citizen living in America in exchange for engaging in the war efforts upon their arrival. Lussier seized on this opportunity, and as a dual citizen she was eligible.

== WWII ==
Due to holding a private pilots licence, upon arrival in England in 1942 Lussier joined the Air Transport Auxiliary and for the RAF ferried both planes and pilots from factories to squadrons. As a female pilot however, she was not permitted to carryout combat missions and fly spitfires. Furious at this decision, she resigned from the RAF ,however within a month was working for the Office of Strategic Services (OSS). in no small part thanks to her Godfather Sir William Stephenson who was head of the British Security Co-ordination.

== Later in life ==
Lussier resigned from the OSS in October 1942 and married Ricardo Sicre, her commanding officer in the OSS. They moved to Spain and had four sons, later divorcing but remained friends. Lussier then moved to Morocco, started a corn farm and championed workers rights. She had two published books recounting her farming exploits in Amid My Alien Corn and One Woman Farm: a Moroccan adventure. Her activism led to her expulsion from Morocco and relocation to Switzerland with her sons.

Lussier also published a book based on her experiences in WWII under the title Intrepid Woman: Betty Lussiers Secret War, 1942 – 1945 published on 31 October 2010 by the Naval Institute Press.
