= Kurt Frederick Ludwig =

American spy for Germany

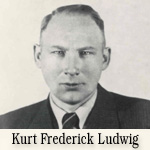
- Born: 4 December 1903; Fremont, Ohio, United States
- Died: 1987 (aged 83–84)
- Espionage activity
- Allegiance: Nazi Germany
- Service years: 1938–1941
- Codename: Fouzie

Kurt Frederick Ludwig (December 4, 1903 – December 1987) was a German spy and the head of the "Joe K" spy ring in the United States in 1940–1941.

The ring was known as Joe K because it was the signature used in letters sent to Berlin addresses giving information on Allied shipping in New York Harbor. Ludwig also used the code name Fouzie—and at least 50 to 60 other aliases, both male and female.

== Early life and career ==
Born in Fremont, Ohio, Ludwig was taken to Germany as a child in 1909, and there he grew up and married. He returned to the United States in 1925 but went back to Germany in 1933. He was arrested in Austria for espionage in February 1938, just prior to the Anschluss, after police had noticed that he had been photographing bridges in the border between Germany and Austria; however, his case was delayed and when time came to act upon his case, the Nazis had taken over Austria the following month. Ludwig then returned to Germany and stayed there until March 1940, when he was ordered to return to the United States to establish a spy ring there.

== Setting up the ring ==
Upon arrival Ludwig went to a boarding house located in Ridgewood, Queens, his operations being paid through the German consulate in New York. He set himself up as a leather-goods salesman and proceeded to recruit agents and couriers from various German-American Bund groups in the New York/Brooklyn area in preparation for his espionage activity: he recruited six men and two women for this purpose, several of whom had little practical experience in espionage. One of the two women was Lucy Boehmler, a pretty 18-year-old high school graduate from Maspeth, Queens, who joined up because she thought it might be fun.

Ludwig made a practice of visiting docks in New York Harbor and along the New Jersey coast where, from his observations, he could report information to Germany on the identities of the ships and their cargoes. He also visited various U.S. Army posts, and reported on the identities of the individual units of each, as well as their organization and equipment which he felt would be of interest to his superiors. By December, Ludwig had also included information regarding aircraft manufacturing and performance based on his surveillance of aircraft plants in the Long Island area (notably Grumman, to which he assigned the code name "Grace").

The information gathered by the ring was sent as mail drops to accommodation addresses in neutral Spain, Portugal, Argentina, and even Germany itself. These harmless looking personal letters would be forwarded to appropriate person within Germany, their true messages hidden in invisible ink. Letters of the highest priority were bound for Heinrich Himmler, who was assigned the alias "Manuel Alonzo"; Reinhard Heydrich, the head of the RSHA was "Lothar Frederick". Other recipients were assigned similar code names.

== Search for the spy ring ==
Authorities in both the U.S. and the United Kingdom were by that time aware that a spy ring was operating out of New York City. The first break came when British Imperial Censorship, located in the Princess Hotel in Bermuda and run by the British Security Coordination (BSC), actually a cover for the Secret Intelligence Service, intercepted a letter written to "Lothar Frederick" and signed by a "Joe K". As it was known that "Lothar" was an alias used by Heydrich, a watch was set for any letter with the Joe K signature. Subsequent letters from Joe K were intercepted, their contents read and recorded, and the envelopes carefully resealed so that their recipients would not detect any evidence of tampering.

Joe K had shown up as the signature on many letters sent to accommodation addresses. In March 1941 BSC chemists detected secret writing in a Joe K letter; the secret message referred to a duplicate letter sent to "Smith" in China. (The censor working on the Joe K correspondence was Nadya Gardner who conducted chemical tests and found secret writing in some letters, according to historian H. Montgomery Hyde.) The BSC mail-intercept operation was run in coordination with the FBI, even though J. Edgar Hoover, the Director of the FBI, and William Stephenson, the head of the BSC, did not get along. The FBI was able to trace the Smith letter and found that it contained a plan of U.S. defenses in Pearl Harbor.

Despite this break, they were still in the dark as to who were involved in the spy ring, until an unexpected event took place that led eventually to its unraveling and downfall.

== Accident in Times Square ==
On the night of March 18, 1941, two men were reportedly arguing about the proper way to cross an intersection in a busy section of Times Square in New York when one of them, a middle-aged man wearing horn-rimmed spectacles and carrying a brown briefcase, foolishly made the attempt to cross the street against a traffic light.

Meanwhile, Sam Lichtman, a cabdriver from southern Brooklyn was driving up 7th Ave. near 45th St. when suddenly a man darted in front of his cab. Despite his attempt to avoid a collision, the man was run down and fatally thrown under the wheels of another car. In the confusion, the man's companion took the brown briefcase and hurriedly fled the scene. The victim was rushed to St. Vincent's Hospital but he died within 24 hours.

The fatally injured man was identified as a courier for the Spanish Consulate, Don Julio Lopez Lido. His body was unclaimed for a time but the Spanish Consulate in New York finally buried him. His companion, who ran from the scene, called the Taft Hotel where the dead man was staying and asked for them to hold the man's room until further notice. In the meantime, the hotel management had informed the local authorities, and they began to investigate the mysterious circumstances behind the accident.

== Investigation ==
The New York Police had taken note of the seemingly uncaring action of Señor Lido's companion as reported by witnesses, and took a deeper look into the dead courier's background. Although he was identified as a Spaniard, they were puzzled by the fact that the dead man's papers were in German, not Spanish; his notebook contained names and possible assignments of some U.S. soldiers; his clothes contained no labels. Moreover, a check made at the hotel room yielded maps, articles on military aviation and other curious items. All of these items were turned over to the FBI.

In the meantime, another Joe K message, also followed up by the FBI, contained a panicky message about a car in New York deliberately running down and killing a certain "Phil". The BSC had informed the FBI that "Phil" had been Captain Ulrich von der Osten of the German Abwehr who had entered the United States via Japan a month prior to his "removal from circulation": he was supposed to direct the activities of a group of spies in the U.S. Based on this, the FBI was able to determine that "Señor Lido" and von der Osten were one and the same.

Piecing together a reference from "Phil's" notebook, an intercepted cable from Portugal to "Fouzie", and information from the Joe K letters themselves, the FBI was able to identify von Osten's companion as Ludwig himself. He was located and thus placed under surveillance to determine his contacts.

== Surveillance ==
It was later known that von der Osten did arrive in the U.S. with the purpose of directing the Joe K spy ring; however, with his untimely death, Ludwig was left in command of the ring. Under FBI surveillance Ludwig was seen continuing his routine of visiting the docks in New York Harbor and U.S. Army posts around the state. On one occasion during May he took an extended trip to Florida, accompanied by Lucy Boehmler who acted as his "secretary" and courier who assisted him in preparing his reports and in maintaining detailed records of his observations by using a toothpick dipped in invisible ink. They stopped along the way at Army camps, airfields, and factories engaged in manufacturing wartime matériel.

When he arrived in Miami, Florida, Ludwig met up with an agent, Carl Hermann Schroetter, and through Schroetter Ludwig was able to send his reports on his observations during the trip, including the progress in the construction of a naval base in Miami.

== Associates ==
Soon, the FBI was able to gather information on all who were connected with the Joe K spy ring, aside from Ludwig and Boehmler (ages given as of time of arrest and/or conviction):

- Rene Charles Froehlich, 31, a German-born U.S. Army private who was stationed in Fort Jay, Governors Island in New York Harbor. He arranged mail drops for Ludwig and picked up his mail when Ludwig went out of town, as well as supplying defense magazines and gathering ship information;
- Mrs. Helen Pauline Mayer, 26, a housewife who aided Ludwig in obtaining information about aircraft manufacturing in plants in the Long Island area; She was the one who introduced Lucy Boehmler to Ludwig.
- Karl (or Carl) Victor Mueller, 36, a machinist who helped gather production figures; and
- Hans Helmut Pagel, 20, and Frederick Edward Schlosser, 19, youths of German extraction who were recruited from the German-American Bund, assisted Ludwig in making observations of various docks and Army posts in the New York area and in mailing the reports through various mail drops.

A ninth member of the ring, known only as "Robert," was tracked down by the FBI through papers obtained from a janitor in a building that housed the German Consulate; the janitor was in charge of the burn-bag detail and regularly put papers in the furnace while the Germans watched. However, he would surreptitiously pull them out, douse the flames, and hand them over to the FBI. "Robert" was identified as Paul Borchardt (1886-1957), a World War I veteran who served in the German Army from 1913 to 1933. He later became an archeologist, but claimed that he was fired from his university post and confined in Dachau for being a Jew. Borchardt agreed to travel to the U.S. posing as a refugee and to spy for Germany due to patriotism.

There was also a tenth member of the ring, codenamed "Bill", who was a German-born Argentinian named Teodore Erdman Erich Lau. He served as paymaster for the Joe K ring.

== Flight and capture ==
When the Duquesne Ring was broken by the FBI in June, 1941, Ludwig and his associates decided to temporarily cease their activities in fear of being caught. Ludwig himself retreated to a summer resort in Pennsylvania, and then drove west in an effort to escape, driving his car along country roads through the Midwest at speeds of up to 90 miles per hour (140 km/h). He stopped at a cabin in Yellowstone National Park in August and tried unsuccessfully to destroy any incriminating evidence. When he arrived in Missoula, Montana, he stored his car, shipped his entire luggage except for the bare necessities to relatives in the East Coast, and continued his journey by bus. When the FBI searched his car, they found that he had left behind his shortwave radio receiver.

Believing that he was planning to leave the U.S. and make his way to Germany via Japan, the FBI arrested him at Cle Elum, Washington on August 23. They then rounded up the rest of the ring, except for Borchardt, who was arrested on December 8, Schroetter, who was arrested in Miami on September 2 and Lau, who eluded capture until October 18, 1946.

== Trial and conviction ==
Ludwig and the rest of the Joe K spy ring were subsequently indicted in the U.S. District Court for the Southern District of New York for treasonable conspiracy and espionage. Lucy Boehmler agreed to testify for the government against her co-defendants. Her quest for thrills already well dissipated, she also wanted to get back at Ludwig, who despite his promise to pay her $25 a week for her services more often than not withheld payment, allegedly because of her shoddy work abilities. She emerged as the star of the trial.

On March 6, 1942, they were all found guilty of all charges. Mayer, Mueller, and Pagel each received 15 year-sentences, Schlosser received 12 years, and Schroetter received 10 years. Lucy Boehmler was sentenced to five years in prison. Because their spying was undertaken before the U.S. entered World War II, Ludwig, Borchardt, and Froehlich avoided possible execution and were each sentenced to 20 years in prison instead. In 1947, Lau pleaded guilty to espionage and was sentenced to 10 years in prison.

Kurt Frederick Ludwig was sent to the Alcatraz Federal Penitentiary to serve out his sentence. He was released in 1953 and deported shortly afterwards.
