= Albert Herrmann =

German archeologist and geographer

Albert Herrmann (20 January 1886 – 19 April 1945) was a German archaeologist and geographer. His specialty was the geography of the ancient Mediterranean and Chinese geography. He also published a number of works theorizing on the location of Atlantis.

== Career ==
The son of Konrad Herrmann (1844-1910), Albert studied at the universities of Göttingen and Berlin. He took his doctor's degree under H. Wagner, studying the course of the Silk Road. He furthered his studies at the Berlin's Oriental Institute, earning the Diploma of Oriental Languages in 1915. He became a member of the Geographical Society of Berlin and the German Oriental Society. In 1923 he obtained a Chair of Historical Geography at the University of Berlin.

Besides his fundamental research in the field of Chinese Geography, his most famous work is Historical and commercial Atlas of China (1935), which was in use worldwide.

He died on 19 April 1945, due to wounds received during an air bombardment of the railway station in Plzeň.

== Search for Atlantis ==
Herrmann was a believer in Paul Borchardt's Atlantis theories, believing Atlantis to have been located in Tunisia. Due to his position within the Nazi Party, his theories carried considerable weight in the German press. In 1925 he received funding for an expedition to Tunisia. Believing he had found evidence for the site of Atlantis in the village of Rhelissia, he theorised that Plato's descriptions of the lost city had been incorrect, and argued that it had in fact existed as recently as the 14th century BCE. Herrmann went on to extrapolate that Atlantis was in fact a colony of Frisland, and that civilisation was therefore Frisian in origin.

== Works ==
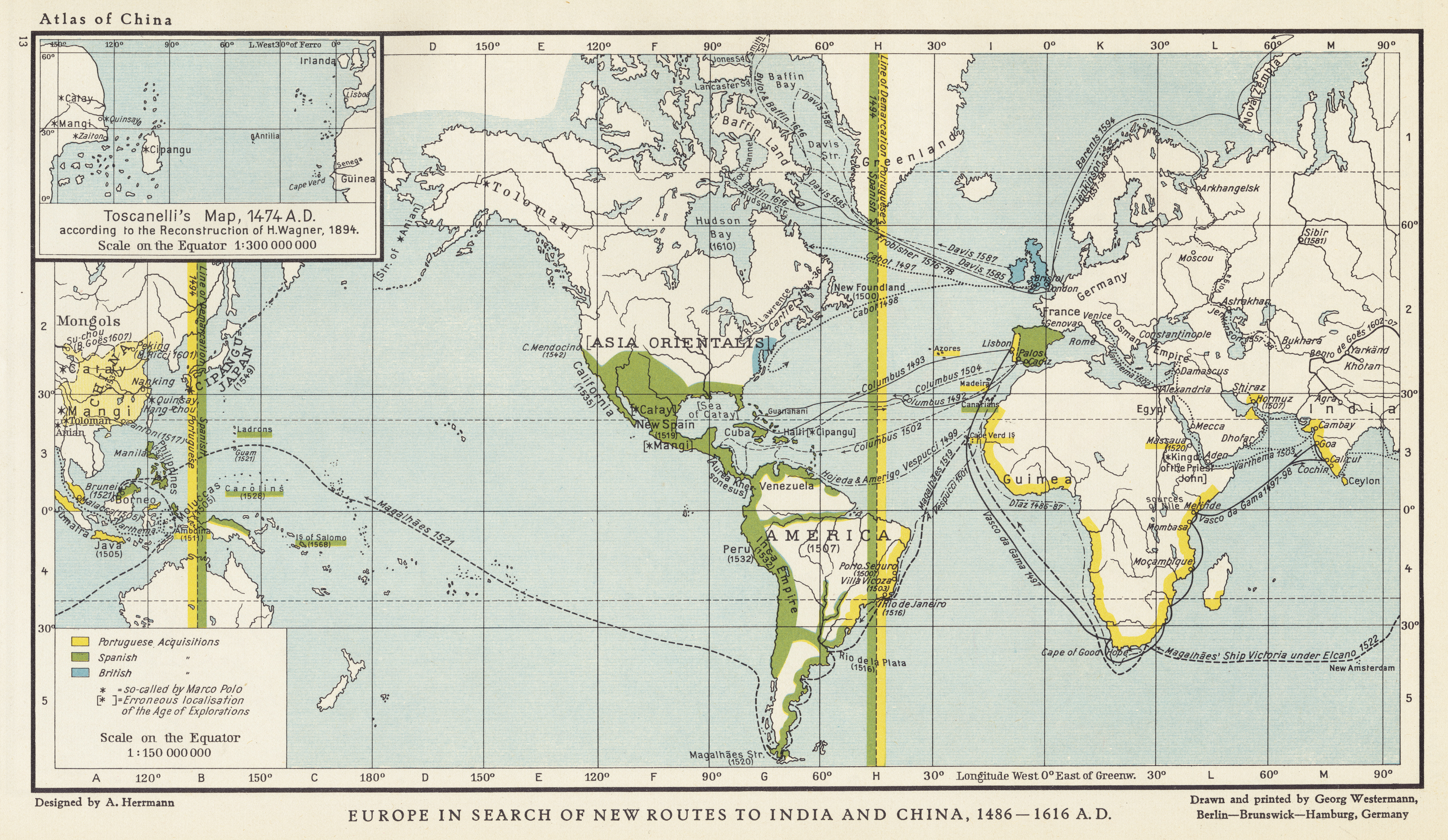
Map showing European explorations in 1486–1616 from Herrmann's atlas of China, 1935

- Die alte Seidenstrassen zwischen China und Syrien: Beiträge zur alten Geographie Asiens. Berlin: Weidmannsche Buchhandlung, 1910.
- „Die alten Verkehrswege zwischen Indien und Südchina nach Ptolemäus“, Zeitschrift der Gesellschaft für Erdkunde. Berlin, 1913, pp. 771–787 English translation at:
- Alte Geographie des unteren Oxusgebiets. 1914.
- „Die altesten chinesischen Karten von Zentral- und Westasien“‘ Ostasiat. Ztg. 8. I919-20. I85-198.
- „ Die Westländer in der Chinesischen Kartographie“, in Sven Hedin, Southern Tibet, Stockholm. 8. 1922. 89-431. Tab 40.
- Die Irrfahrten des Odysseus. 1926.
- „Marinus von Tyrus“, Petermanns Mitteilungen, Ergänzungsheft no. 209, 1930, pp. 45–54.
- Lou-lan: China, Indien und Rom im Lichte der Ausgrabungen am Lobnor, with a foreword by Sven Hedin, Leipzig, F. A. Brockhaus, 1931.
- Marco Polo: Am Hofe des Grosskhans - Reisen in Hochasien und China, Leipzig, F. A. Brockhaus, 1916 and 1949.
- Die Erdkarte der Urbibel. Braunschweig. 1931. 203 p.
- Unsere Ahnen und Atlantis; nordische Seeherrschaft von Skandinavien bis nach Nordafrika. 1934.
- „Die älteste türkische Weltkarte (1076 p. n. Chr.)“, Imago Mundi. I. 1935. 2I-28.
- Historical and commercial Atlas of China, with Harvard-Yenching Institute (Cambridge, Massachusetts). Korea branch, Cambridge, Massachusetts: Harvard University Press, 1935.
- „Pyramius Wandkarte von Deutschland (Brassel. 1547)“. Congr. Geogr. Intern. 1938. Comptes rendus, T.II. Trav. d. 1. Sect. IV. Leiden I938. 122.
- Das Land der Seide und Tibet im Lichte der Antike. 1938.
- „Südostasien auf der Ptolemauskarte“. Forschungen und Fortschritte. I4. 1938. 398-400.
- „Die Länder des Nordens in Kartenbilde vom Altertum bis zum I9. Jahrhundert“. Der Norden. I6. 1939. 210-224.
- Die ältesten Karten von Deutschland bis Gerhard Mercator. Leipzig 1940. 2˚. 22 Taf.
- „Die ältesten Karten Deutschlands bis Gerhard Mercator und ihre Bedeutung für die Gegenwart“. Jahrb. d. Kartogr. I. 194I. 59-80.
- „Die Germania des Christophorus Pyramius (I547), die älteste Wandkarte von Deutschland“. Forschungen und Fortschritte. I942. 25I-253.
- “South-Eastern Asia on Ptolemy’s Map”, Research and Progress: Quarterly Review of German Science, vol.V, no.2, March–April 1939, pp. 121–127, p. 123.
- Das Land der Seide und Tibet; Quellen und Forschungen zur Geschichte der Geographie und Völkerkunde, H. I, 1938, S. 63 ft.
- An Historical Atlas of China, prefatory essay by Paul Wheatley, Chicago: Aldine Pub. Co., 1966.
- „Der Magnus Sinus und Cattigara nach Ptolemaeus“ (The Sinus Magnus and Cattigara according to Ptolemy), International Geographical Congress, Comptes Rendus du Congrès International de Géographie, Amsterdam, 1938, Leiden, Brill, 1938, tome II, section IV, p. 127.
