= Richard Brooker =

Richard Brooker is the name of:

- Richard Melville Brooker (1909–1994), British Army lieutenant colonel, spy instructor and commando during the Second World War
- Richard Brooker (actor) (1954–2013), English actor and stunt performer
