= Camp X =

WWII Allied training base in Canada

Camp X; S 25-1-1; Project-J; Special Training School 103
- Near Whitby, Ontario in Canada
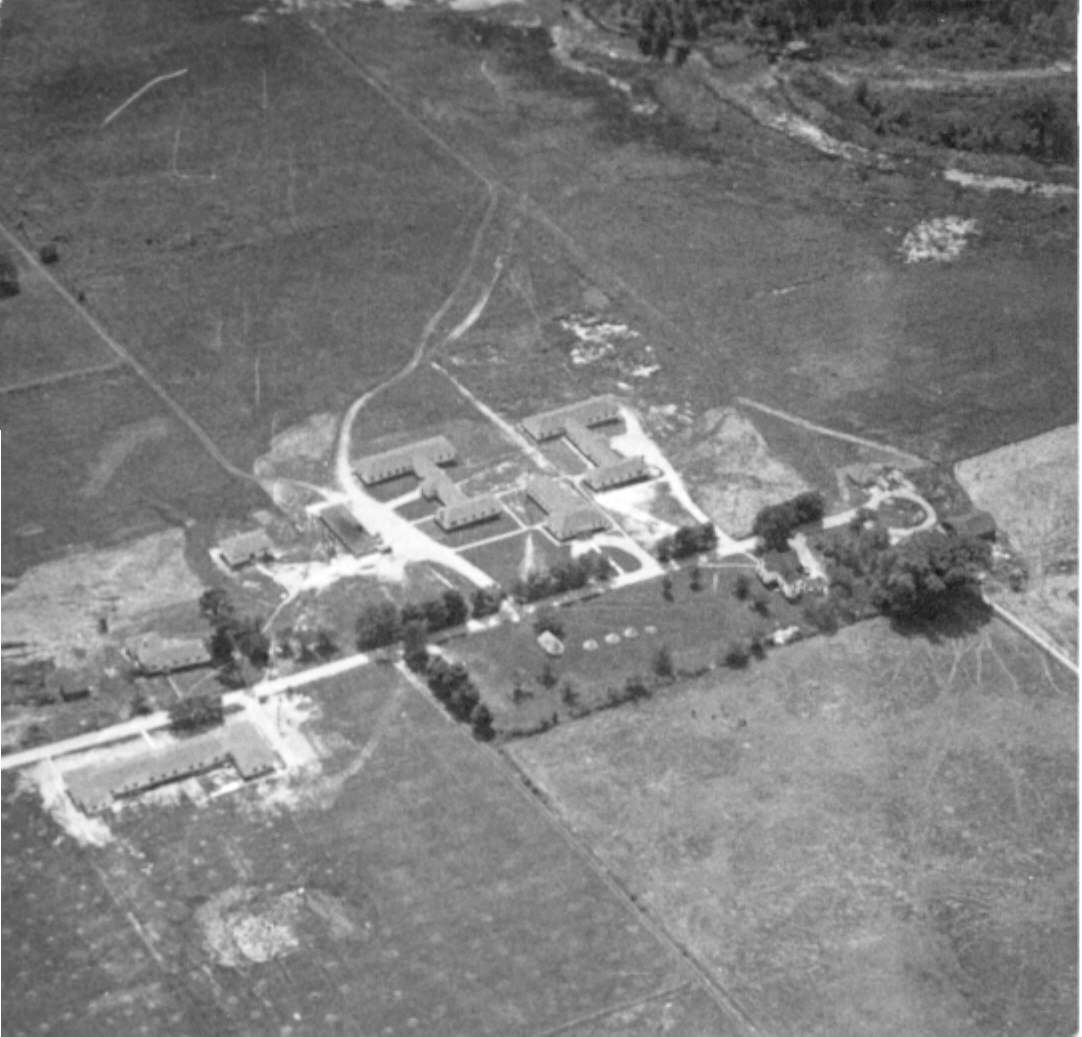
- Camp X in 1943

Site information
- Type: Training installation

Location
- Shown within Ontario
- Coordinates: 43°51′15″N 078°53′06″W

Site history
- Built: December 6, 1941
- In use: 1941–1969
- Fate: Destroyed

Garrison information
- Past commanders: Sir William Stephenson, Lt. Col. Arthur Terence Roper-Caldbeck
- Occupants: Roald Dahl; John Skinner Wilson; Paul Dehn; Ian Fleming (disputed)

Camp X was the unofficial name of the secret Special Training School No. 103, a Second World War British paramilitary installation for training covert agents in the methods required for success in clandestine operations. It was located on the northwestern shore of Lake Ontario between Whitby and Oshawa in Ontario, Canada. The area is known today as Intrepid Park, after the code name for Sir William Stephenson, Director of British Security Co-ordination (BSC), who established the program to create the training facility.

The facility was jointly operated by the Canadian military, with help from Foreign Affairs and the RCMP but commanded by the BSC; it also had close ties with MI6. In addition to the training program, the Camp had a communications tower that could send and transmit radio and telegraph communications, called Hydra.

Established December 6, 1941, the training facility closed before the end of 1944; the buildings were removed in 1969 and a monument was erected at the site.

Historian Bruce Forsyth summarized the purpose of the facility: "Trainees at the camp learned sabotage techniques, subversion, intelligence gathering, lock picking, explosives training, radio communications, encode/decode, recruiting techniques for partisans, the art of silent killing and unarmed combat." Communication training, including Morse code, was also provided. The existence of the camp was kept such a secret that even Canadian Prime Minister William Lyon Mackenzie King was unaware of its full purpose.

== Overview ==
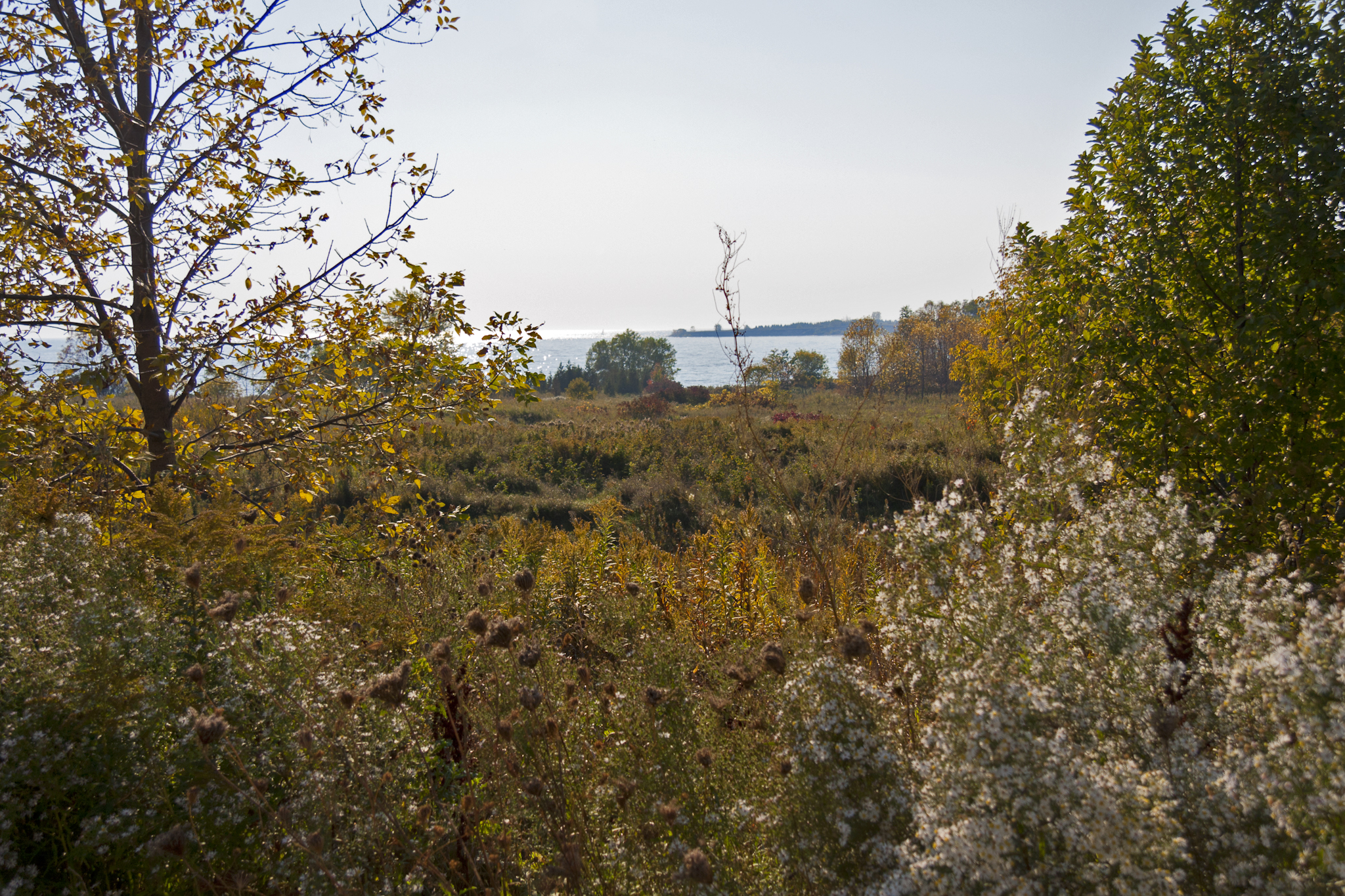
A view of part of the site of Camp X looking toward Lake Ontario.

Camp X was established December 6, 1941, by the chief of British Security Co-ordination (BSC), Sir William Stephenson, a Canadian from Winnipeg, Manitoba and a close confidant of Winston Churchill and Franklin Delano Roosevelt. The camp was originally designed to link Britain and the US at a time when the US was forbidden by the Neutrality Act to be directly involved in World War II.

On the day before the attack on Pearl Harbor and America's entry into the war, Camp X had opened for the purpose of training Allied agents from the Special Operations Executive (SOE), Federal Bureau of Investigation (FBI), and American Office of Strategic Services (OSS) intended to be dropped behind enemy lines for clandestine missions as saboteurs and spies.

However, even before the United States entered the war on December 8, 1941, agents from America's intelligence services expressed an interest in sending personnel for training at the soon to be opened Camp X. Agents from the FBI and the OSS (forerunner of the Central Intelligence Agency, or CIA) secretly attended Camp X in early 1942; at least a dozen attended at least some training.

After Stephenson established the facility and acted as the Camp's first head, the first commandant was Lt. Col. Arthur Terence Roper-Caldbeck. Colonel William "Wild Bill" Donovan, war-time head of the OSS, credited Stephenson with teaching Americans about foreign intelligence gathering. The CIA even named their recruit training facility "The Farm", a nod to the original farm that existed at the Camp X site.

Camp X was jointly operated by the BSC and the Government of Canada. There were several names for the school: S 25-1-1 by the Royal Canadian Mounted Police (RCMP), Project-J by the Canadian military, and Special Training School No. 103. The latter was set by the Special Operations Executive, administered under the cover of the Ministry of Economic Warfare (MEW) which operated the facility. In 1942 the Commandant of the camp was Lieutenant Colonel R. M. Brooker of the British Army.

In addition to operating an excellent document forging facility, Camp X trained numerous Allied covert operatives. An estimate published by the CBC states that "By war's end, between 500 and 2,000 Allied agents had been trained (figures vary) and sent abroad..." behind enemy lines.

Reports indicate that graduates worked as "secret agents, security personnel, intelligence officers, or psychological warfare experts, serving in clandestine operations". Many were captured, tortured, and executed; survivors received no individual recognition for their efforts."

The predominant close-combat trainer for the British Special Operations Executive was William E. Fairbairn, called "Dangerous Dan". With instructor Eric A. Sykes, they trained numerous agents for the SOE and OSS. Fairbairn's technique was "Get down in the gutter, and win at all costs ... no more playing fair ... to kill or be killed." Another group operated Station M for developing and making covert devices for the British Security Co-ordination. Casa Loma in Toronto is often stated as the location of this station, claiming that the book Inside Camp X is the source. In 2015, however, author Lynn Philip Hodgson rejected this in an interview with the Toronto Star. "Nobody knows where Station M was. You won't read where it was in any book." It is more likely, though not certain, that the Casa Loma stables housed the development and production of ASDIC sonar devices for U-boat detection.

Gustave Biéler, a Montrealer of Swiss origin, worked with SOE agents and French Resistance in Northern France before the D-Day invasion. "The group destroyed railways, bridges, troop transports and gasoline stores and hampering enemy movement and supplies," according to a CBC report. He was captured and executed by the Nazis in 1944.

After the US entered the war, the OSS operated an "assassination and elimination" training program that was dubbed "the school of mayhem and murder" by George Hunter White. William Donovan later started similar programs in Maryland and Virginia, as well as in Cairo, Egypt. The Virginia Quantico training center was initially based on Camp X programs.

== Hydra ==
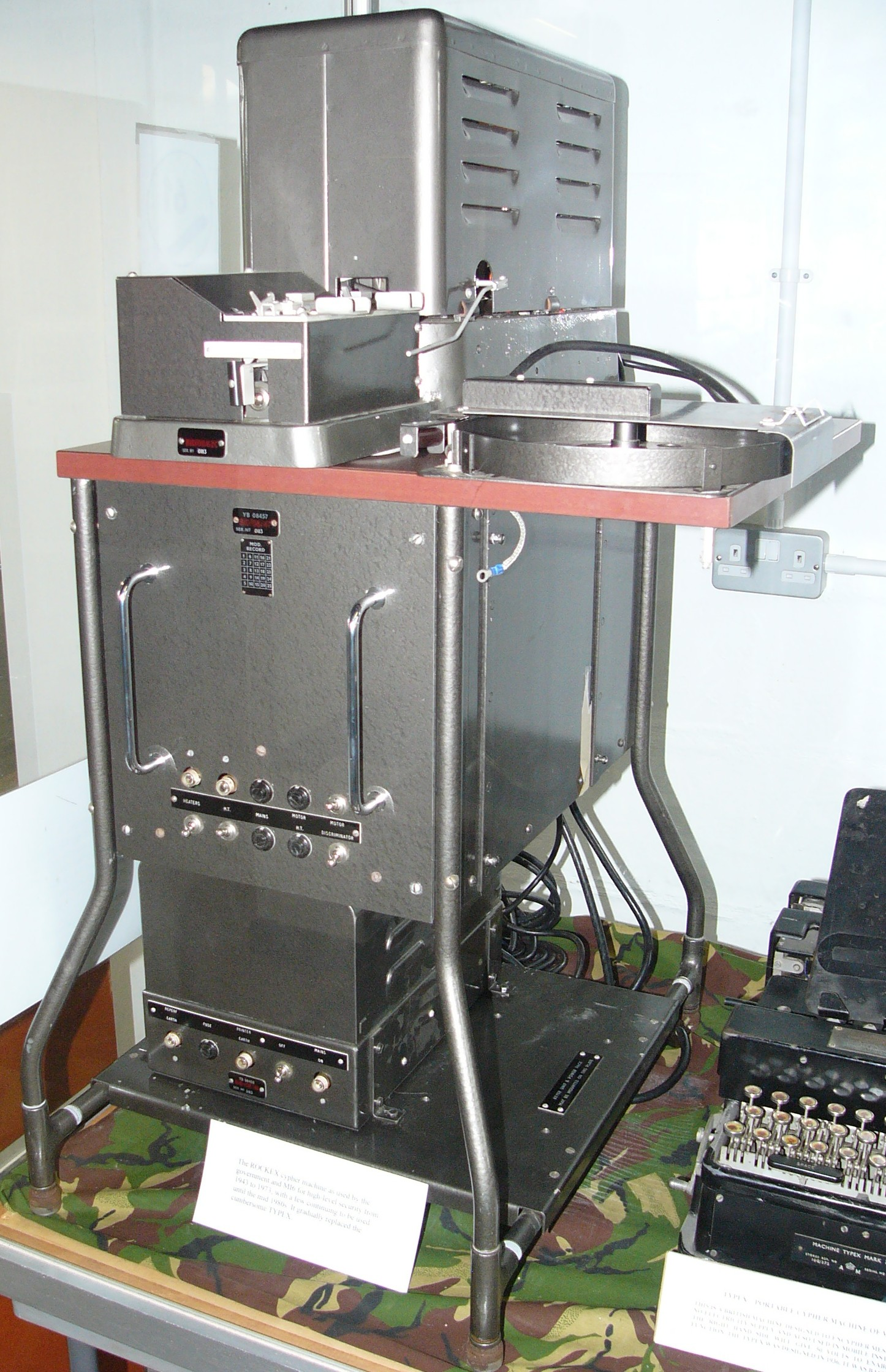
Rockex equipment invented by Benjamin deForest Bayly

One of the unique features of Camp X was Hydra, a sophisticated telecommunications relay station established in May 1942 by engineer Benjamin deForest Bayly. Bayly was the assistant director, with British army rank of lieutenant colonel. He also invented a fast offline, one-time tape cipher machine for coding/decoding telegraph transmissions labelled the Rockex or "Telekrypton".

The book Inside Camp X indicates that the facility was located on Lake Ontario, 30 miles across from the U.S., because it was an ideal location for receiving radio communications from Europe and South America via the U.S. The camp was an appropriate location for the safe transfer of code due to the topography of the land; it was also an excellent site for picking up radio signals from the United Kingdom. A news article also indicates that "HAM Operators at Camp X used transmitters to send and receive coded messages from Britain behind enemy lines".

Hydra sent and received Allied radio (including telegraph) signals from around the world. The Government of Canada later stated that Hydra provided "an essential tactical and strategic component of the larger Allied radio network, secret information was transmitted securely to and from Canada, Great Britain, other Commonwealth countries and the United States".

The Hydra station was valuable for both coding and decoding information in relative safety from the prying ears of German radio observers and Nazi detection. Hydra also had direct access via land lines to Ottawa, New York City and Washington, D.C. for telegraph and telephone communications. The main transmitter was previously used as that of American AM station WCAU's shortwave sibling W3XAU, and upon severance of W3XAU in 1941, the transmitter was refurbished and became the transmitter for Hydra. Other radio apparatus was purchased discreetly from amateur radio enthusiasts, brought to the building in pieces and assembled on site.

After use by the Canadian Forces during the Cold War, the transmitter was scrapped in 1969.

== Post-war use ==
One of the trainees, or at least a visitor, may have been Ian Fleming, later famous for his James Bond books, according to the book Inside Camp X by Lynn Philip Hodgson. (While in Toronto, Fleming stayed at a hotel near St. James-Bond United Church, but many believe the name was borrowed from a noted American ornithologist.) There is however evidence against this claim. The character of James Bond was "a highly romanticised version of the true spy" William Stephenson, and what Fleming once learned from him.

Children's book writer Roald Dahl and British screenwriter Paul Dehn also trained at the camp.

After it had closed in the fall of 1945, Camp X was used by the RCMP as a secure location for interviewing Soviet embassy cypher-clerk Igor Gouzenko, who had defected to Canada on 5 September and revealed an extensive Soviet espionage operation in the country. Gouzenko and his family spent two years at the facility.

Later, until the buildings were destroyed in 1969, the camp became the Oshawa Wireless Station under operation by the Royal Canadian Corps of Signals as a secret listening location. Any records not previously destroyed were stored under the Official Secrets Act. The site, located on Boundary Road in Whitby, Ontario, is now a passive park named "Intrepid Park". In recent years, the park has been the site of annual Remembrance Day ceremonies hosted by 2 Intelligence Company, a military intelligence unit based in Toronto, Ontario.

A damaged building from Camp X had been found and was being restored in 2016. Artifacts from the spy camp are still occasionally found in the park. In August 2016, a hobbyist with a metal detector uncovered a rusty World War II smoke mortar round, triggering a visit from Canadian Forces Base Trenton's bomb disposal team.

Joint Task Force X, the Canadian Armed Forces’ human intelligence unit, traces its name and lineage to Camp X and the clandestine operations conducted by the Special Operations Executive during World War 2.

=== Memorial ===
The historic plaque erected at Intrepid Park commemorates the school, which taught the techniques of secret warfare, and Hydra, which became an essential communications centre. An adjacent plaque is dedicated to the memory of Sir William Stephenson.

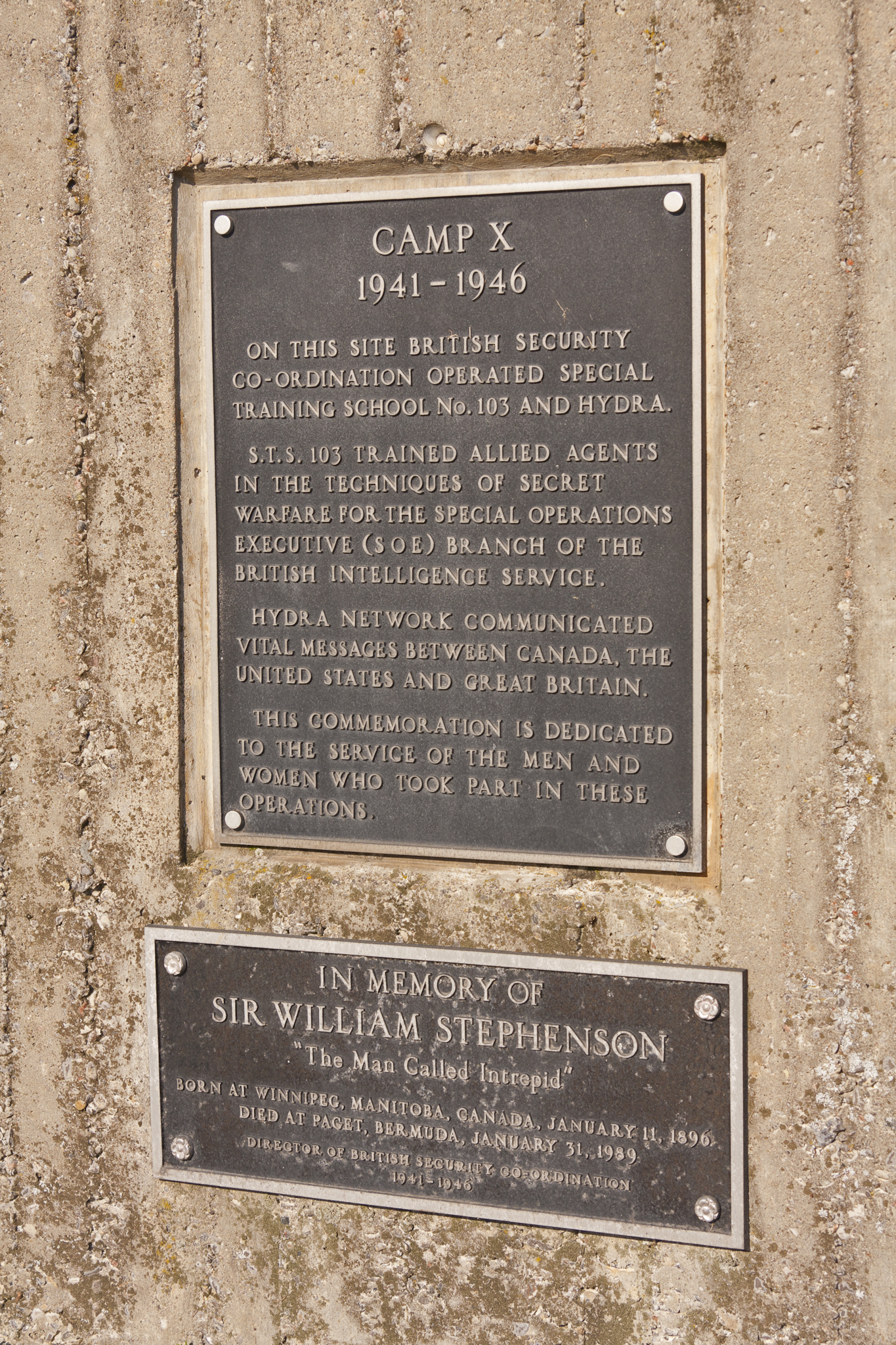
Plaque and memorial at the site of Camp X

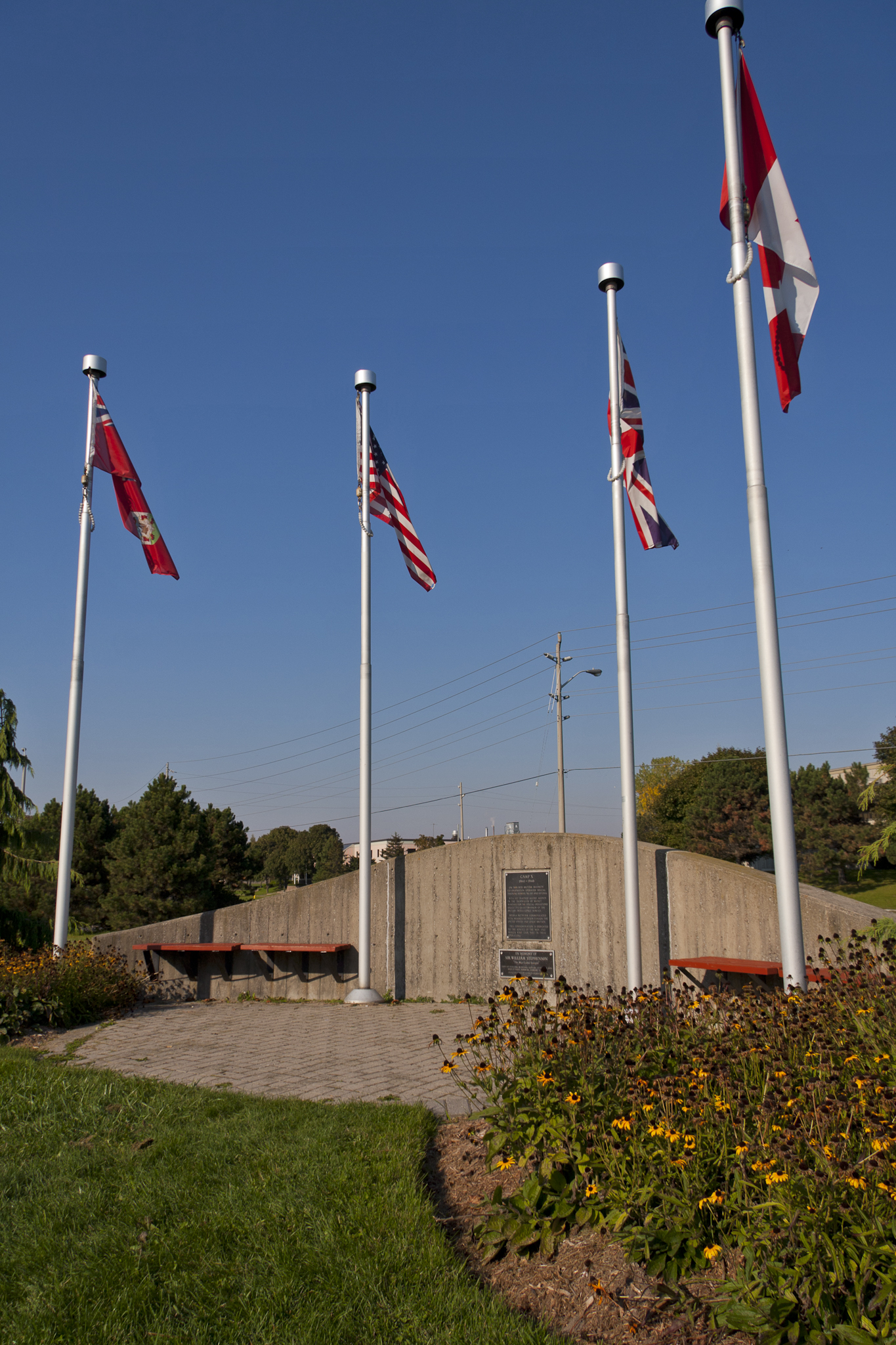
Monument at the site of Camp X in Whitby, Ontario

== In the media ==
Camp X has been featured in movies and television programs, including the CBC series of X Company, three seasons, 2015 to 2017, and the History Channel's documentary Camp X: Secret Agent School, July 2014, by Toronto's Yap Films. The latter included recreations of scenes and featured interviews with actual individuals who had been associated with the camp.
