= Hamilton Princess & Beach Club =

Hotel in Bermuda

Coordinates: 32.2906°N 64.7925°W

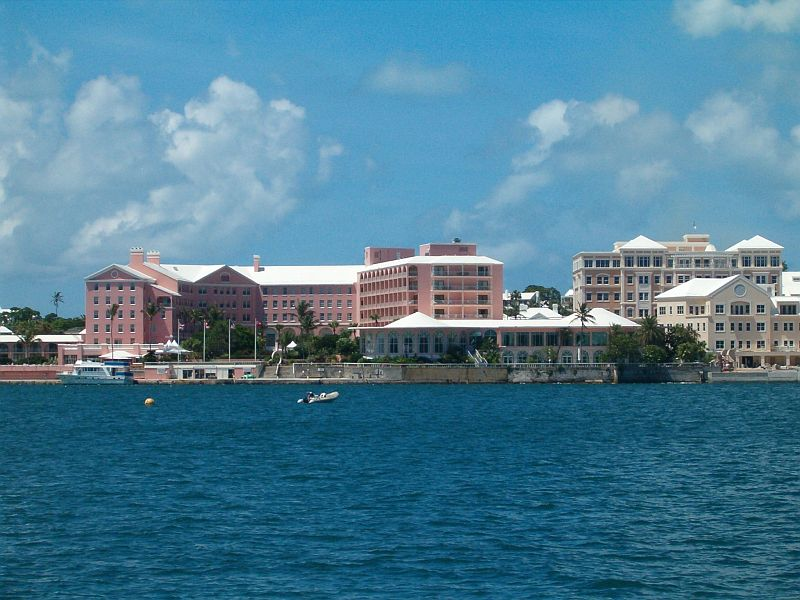
- Interactive map of the Hamilton Princess & Beach Club area
- Hotel chain: Fairmont Hotels and Resorts

General information
- Location: Pembroke, Bermuda
- Opening: 1 January 1885
- Owner: BERCO

Technical details
- Floor count: 7

Other information
- Number of rooms: 380
- Number of restaurants: 4
- Parking: free

Website
- thehamiltonprincess.com

The Hamilton Princess & Beach Club, A Fairmont Managed Hotel (generally known as The Pink Palace) is one of the grandest and most famous hotels in Bermuda, located in Pembroke Parish just outside the City of Hamilton. It also happens to be one of the oldest hotel in the Fairmont chains. One of the largest in Bermuda, it has 380 rooms and suites. It is one of two Fairmont Hotels on the island, the second being the Fairmont Southampton, which was originally opened as the Southampton Princess.

== History ==
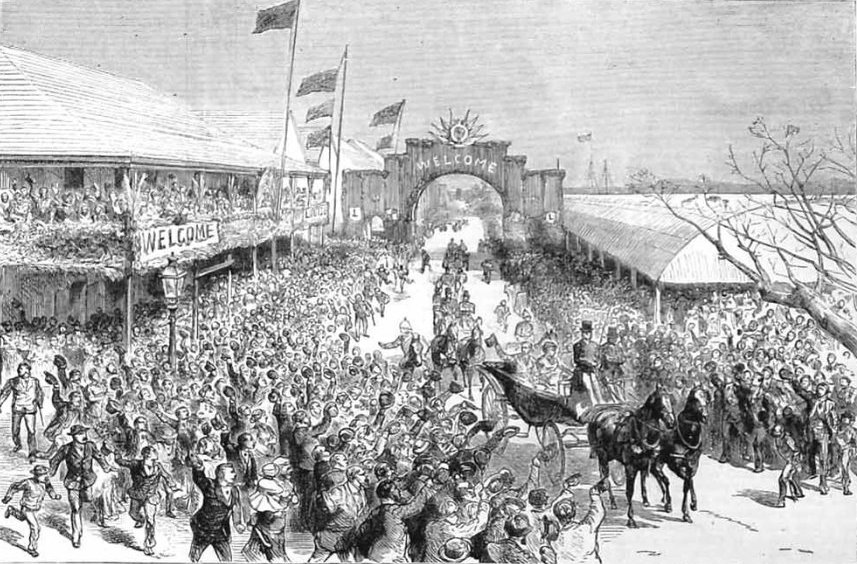
The arrival of Princess Louise in Hamilton, in 1883

The 'Princess Hotel' opened its doors on 1 January 1885. Since then it has had a number of operators. Although recent operators have modified the name, to the Hamilton Princess & Beach Club following the completion of the Southampton Princess, and current operators Fairmont Hotels and Resorts prefix the name of their own group, to most Bermudians it remains "The Princess".

=== Advent of tourism ===
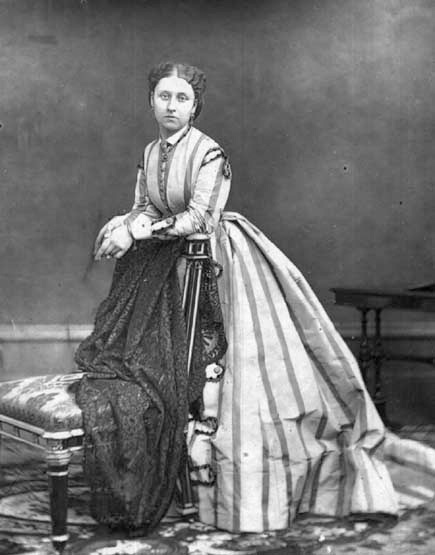
Princess Louise in the 1860s

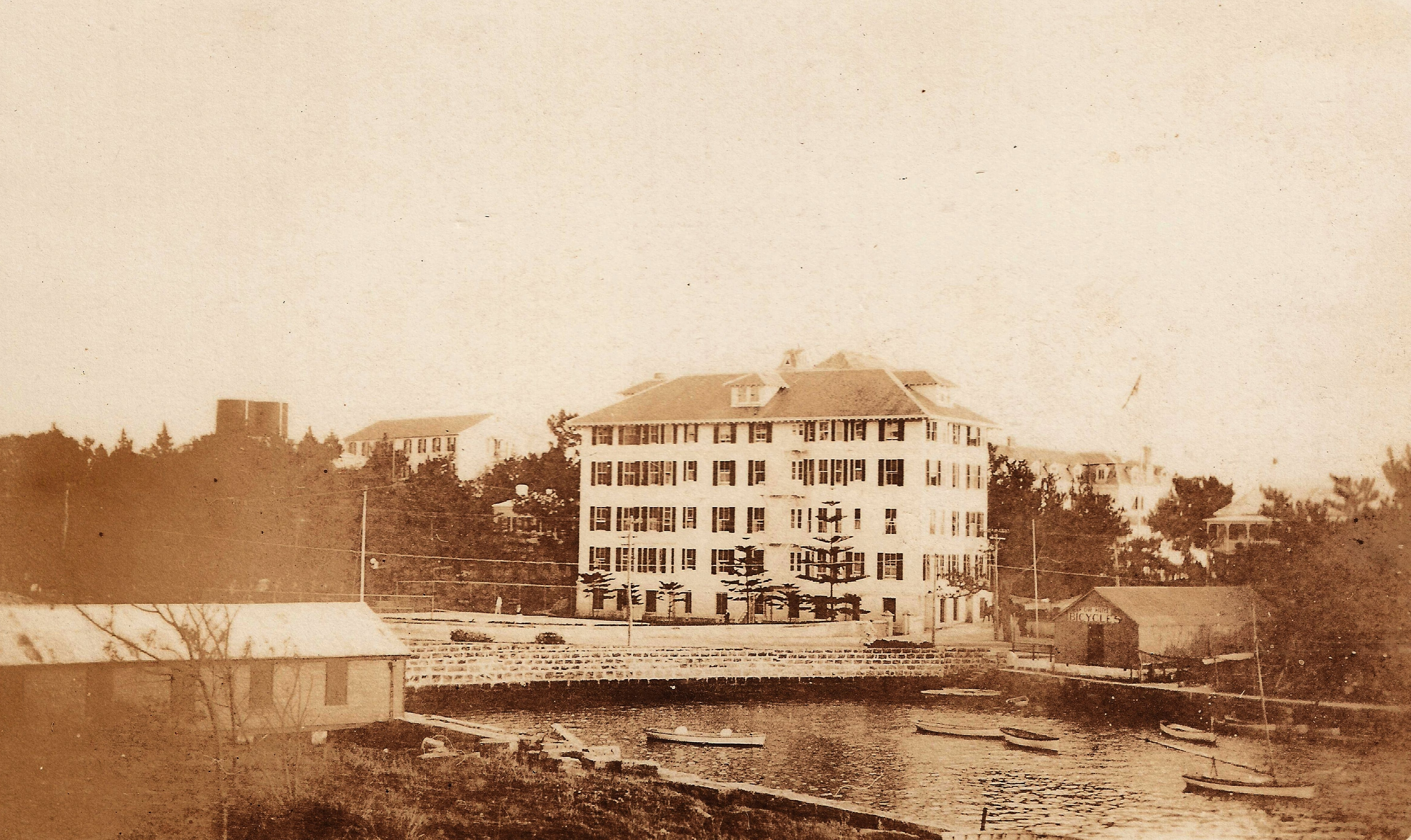
The Princess, seen from the landward side, circa 1900

Bermuda had gained international recognition in 1883 when Princess Louise, the fourth daughter of Queen Victoria, visited for a winter retreat and called it a place of eternal spring. At the time, she lived in Canada with her husband, the Duke of Argyll, who was Governor General there. When the hotel opened it was named The Princess in honour of the royal visit two years earlier.

Princess Louise had been induced to travel from Canada for health reasons. Many other early travellers to Bermuda were wealthy businessmen and political figures, with their families, drawn partly by the colony's reputation for a healthy climate, especially during the winter months, and also by a pace of life that was a suitable tonic for the stress and hectic pressures they experienced at home. The Bermuda Government's Trade Development Board, quickly grasping the marketing advantages of this reputation, began billing Bermuda as the Isles of Serenity.

The journey to Bermuda, whether by sail or by early steamship, was arduous (Princess fixture Samuel Clemens quipped, Bermuda is Heaven, but you have to go through Hell to get there!), especially as, in the early years of the industry, visitors travelled to the island for the winter months. As Princess Louise had done, most would spend the entire winter there, the period becoming known as the Season. Summers in Bermuda, by comparison, were relatively quiet.

=== Bermuda as a naval base and army garrison ===
Bermuda's tourism had arisen without conscious planning, and the hotels previously available to the wealthy visitors who pioneered holidaying on the island were generally small and uninspiring. Bermudian business and political leaders realised that a large, first-rate hotel was required. The development of the hotel hinged on American investment, however. Foreigners were not, then, permitted to buy land or businesses in Bermuda, lest their governments use protecting those interests as a pretext for invasion.

A parade at Prospect Camp in Bermuda.

Bermuda was, at the time, considered by the UK government more as a naval and military base than as a colony (it housed the chief Royal Navy base in the western North Atlantic, and the attendant large military garrison to guard it). The military personnel made up a quarter of the population, and defence spending, not agriculture or tourism, was the central leg of the Bermudian economy. Many wealthy American visitors actually brought their daughters to holiday on the island specifically in hopes of marrying them to young aristocratic military or naval officers (this put them in competition with local women, but the Princess sponsored dances and other social gatherings to which the officers of the garrison were invited to mingle with guests).

The UK Government had been imploring the Bermuda Government for decades to raise its own part-time military units to allow the withdrawal of some of the regular army detachments. This was due to the immense costs of the garrisons in Bermuda and elsewhere, at a time when the Army was attempting to re-organise itself to be more effective. As the Army's budget was not being increased, this could only be achieved by redisposition of existing units. The Bermudian Government had long ignored these pleas, but needed the approval of the UK Government to allow US investment in the Princess, as well as to widen the channel into St. George's (necessary to allow that port to continue to thrive in an age where ships had grown too large to safely use the existing channel, but which it was argued would make an invader's task easier). The Secretary of State for War insisted he could not approve either project while Bermuda contributed nothing to her own defence.

Ultimately, the Bermuda Government would not honour its end of the agreement until a decade after the Princess Hotel was opened. Two 1892 Acts of the Bermudian Parliament authorised the creation in 1894 and 1895 of the Bermuda Volunteer Rifle Corps and the Bermuda Militia Artillery.

=== Development and marketing of The Princess ===
Harley Trott, a leading businessman at the time and head of Trott & Cox, the steamship agents and purveyors of meat for the British military, was determined to build a hotel that would attract affluent Americans, who would summer in the Berkshires and winter in Bermuda.

From the moment it opened, The Princess was considered the gem of the island. With long shady verandas and a blue slate roof, the four-story building comprised 70 rooms, each equipped with gas lights, hot and cold running water and a five-inch mirror to allow guests to primp before stepping out for the night. Staff dressed in white jackets and waving pink handkerchiefs greeted luxury liners.

As word got out, celebrities started to appear. Mark Twain, a regular at the hotel, loved to smoke cigars on the veranda and wartime guest Ian Fleming is said to have used its fish tank-lined Gazebo Bar as a motif in his novel, Dr. No.

=== British Government use in the Second World War ===
In 1939, when the world went to war, The Fairmont Hamilton Princess was under British Censorship and home to Allied servicemen. The basement became an intelligence center and way station where all trans-Atlantic mail, radio and telegraphic traffic bound for Europe, the U.S. and the Far East were intercepted and analyzed by 1,200 censors, of British Imperial Censorship, part of British Security Coordination (BSC), before being routed to their destination. Rumor has it that it was nicknamed 'Bletchley-in-the-Tropics' after the Bletchley Park, where the Enigma code was broken (Sir William Stephenson, the Canadian-born British spymaster who was the subject of the book and film A Man Called Intrepid resided for a time at the Princess, following the war, before buying a home on the island, and was often visited there by his former subordinate, James Bond novelist Ian Fleming).

"A thousand people worked in the basement, checking to see if letters contained messages in invisible ink or if an extra period, when magnified, might reveal a hidden message," according to former hotel manager Ian Powell. With BSC working closely with the FBI, the censors were responsible for the discovery and arrest of a number of Axis spies operating in the US, including the Joe K ring. The censor working on the Joe K correspondence was Nadya Gardner, who conducted chemical tests and found secret writing in some letters, according to historian H. Montgomery Hyde.

=== Post-War development ===
The years that followed the war brought great changes to Bermuda's visitor industry, and to The Princess Hotel.

Prior to the war, visitors arrived almost exclusively by sea. Although air service to Bermuda began in 1937, two years before the declaration of war, the flying boats that operated to Darrell's Island were few, and their seats were limited. Tickets for the hours-long flights from the US were expensive, and ocean liners continued to play a major role in passenger transport to and from Bermuda. Holidaying in Bermuda (catering to which, for hoteliers, had expanded into a year-round business, no longer focused on the original Winter season) remained a prerogative of the wealthy.

The war had resulted in the development of two American airstations on Bermuda, the Naval Operating Base, serving US Navy flying boats, and the US Army's Kindley Field, as well as the establishment of a United States Army garrison of artillery and infantry defences to re-inforce the British Army's Bermuda Garrison. Bermuda's use as a forming-up point for trans-Atlantic convoys meant that numerous ships carrying American soldiers to the North African and European theatres of war, as well as a working up area for Allied Naval vessels deploying to those theatres or escorting convoys, also brought vast numbers of Americans from all levels of society to Bermuda during the war. This both exposed Bermuda to America's working and middle classes, and exposed those classes to Bermudians. Following the war, the air transport industry went through rapid development, with piston, turboprop, and then jet-engined landplane airliners of increasing size and speed serving Bermuda from ever more North American cities, flying into the US Army's new airfield (flying boat air service to Darrell's Island ceased in 1948). This led to larger numbers of air arrivals, and falling ticket prices, opening Bermuda to short-term holidays by the average American family.

These new visitors were less interested in attending balls, hunting aristocratic husbands, or Bermuda's other traditional genteel and wintry leisure activities. New hotels had sprung up in Bermuda even before the war, such as the Castle Harbour Hotel and the Elbow Beach Hotel, which offered visitors direct access to the beach in more natural surroundings, and better catered to sun-seekers and hedonists. More beach resorts were built after the war, including the Carlton Beach resort, the Grotto Bay Beach Resort & Spa, and the Princess' own sister hotel, the Southampton Princess (currently dubbed the Fairmont Southampton), built in 1972 on a 100-acre (40 ha) parcel near to the most popular public beaches, with its own private beach club and golf course. Cottage colonies, such as the Cambridge Beaches, also became a popular alternative to traditional hotels, with visitors renting discrete cottages on a resort property, usually with its own private beach, and served by a common building with guest services and a restaurant or dining room.

The Princess was able to cater to a degree to these new holidaymakers with a cottage colony of its own on the headland at the Pitt's Bay side of the hotel, which had formerly been the site of the Bermuda Coal Company's wharf. The hotel was rebilled as The Princess Hotel and The Cottage Colony. Its location simply did not allow it to compete directly with the new beach resorts. Although tourism visitors have remained an important part of its clientele, with Bermuda's post-war development as a financial centre (it has long been the global centre of the Reinsurance industry, and international business, not tourism, has been its primary source of revenue for decades), the hotel has taken full advantage of its proximity to the City of Hamilton, and its modern, business-friendly features (from internet connectivity in guest rooms to facilities suitable for business conferences), to cater to the numerous business travellers who have little time for sunbathing or golf (its only competitors for this business would have been the Hamilton Hotel), which burnt down in 1955 and was replaced by the Hamilton City Hall, and the Bermudiana Hotel, which also was destroyed by fire in 1958. Although replaced by a new Bermudiana Hotel, the long decline of Bermuda's visitor industry led to its closure (it was sold in 1993 and levelled, the site being redeveloped as office space, including the ACE and XL buildings).

In January 1948, British holiday camp mogul Billy Butlin purchased the hotel for £300,000. In November 1952, Intercontinental Hotels, the lodging division of Pan American World Airways, assumed management of the Princess, though Butlin retained ownership. Intercontinental announced plans to add air conditioning and a larger swimming pool. They managed the hotel until December 1, 1954.

In 1959, American tanker billionaire Daniel K. Ludwig purchased the hotel. As part of the deal to build a new luxury hotel - The Southampton Princess - The Princess was renovated: the last parts of the original wooden structure were replaced with masonry in 1962, and the cottage colony was levelled and a new Pitt's Bay wing built and lounges added. Affluent neighbours of the hotel objected to the original plans to match the height of the existing structure, and approval was granted only for the resulting three-storey wing. Ludwig made The Princess hotel (after 1972 often referred to as the Hamilton Princess to distinguish it from the Southampton Princess) the flagship of a global chain, Princess International Hotels.

The Princess Hotels Group passed to Tiny Rowland's British conglomerate, Lonrho Plc (originally the London and Rhodesian Mining and Land Company Limited), between 1979 and 1981 for US$200 million.

Both Bermudian hotels were sold as part of a seven-property deal by the Lonrho Plc subsidiary, Lonmin plc, which transferred the Princess Hotels Group on 11 June 1998 to the Canadian Pacific Railway for a combined price of GBP 331.75 million. This was part of the final expansion of Canadian Pacific Hotels, which also included the 1999 purchase of the San Francisco-based Fairmont Hotel chain. The seven hotels of the Princess Hotels Group at first continued as a wholly owned subsidiary of CPH, but were later merged into the Fairmont Hotels and Resorts group, as Canadian Pacific Hotels and Resorts was renamed in 2001.

=== Recent developments ===
On 11 May 2006, an agreement for the acquisition of Fairmont Hotels and Resorts by Kingdom Hotels International and Colony Capital LLC for US$4.5 billion was announced. The Fairmont Hotels and Resorts group was combined with two other subsidiaries, Raffles Hotels & Resorts and Swissôtel Hotels and Resorts, to form Fairmont Raffles Hotels International, with 120 hotels in 24 countries.

In 2007 the Princess Hotel was sold to Global Hospitality Investments (GHI), and then in 2012 sold to local company BERCO owned by the Bermudian Green family, which continues to operate the hotel as part of the Fairmont chain. The Princess is the oldest hotel in the chain.
