= British Information Services =

British government propaganda organization

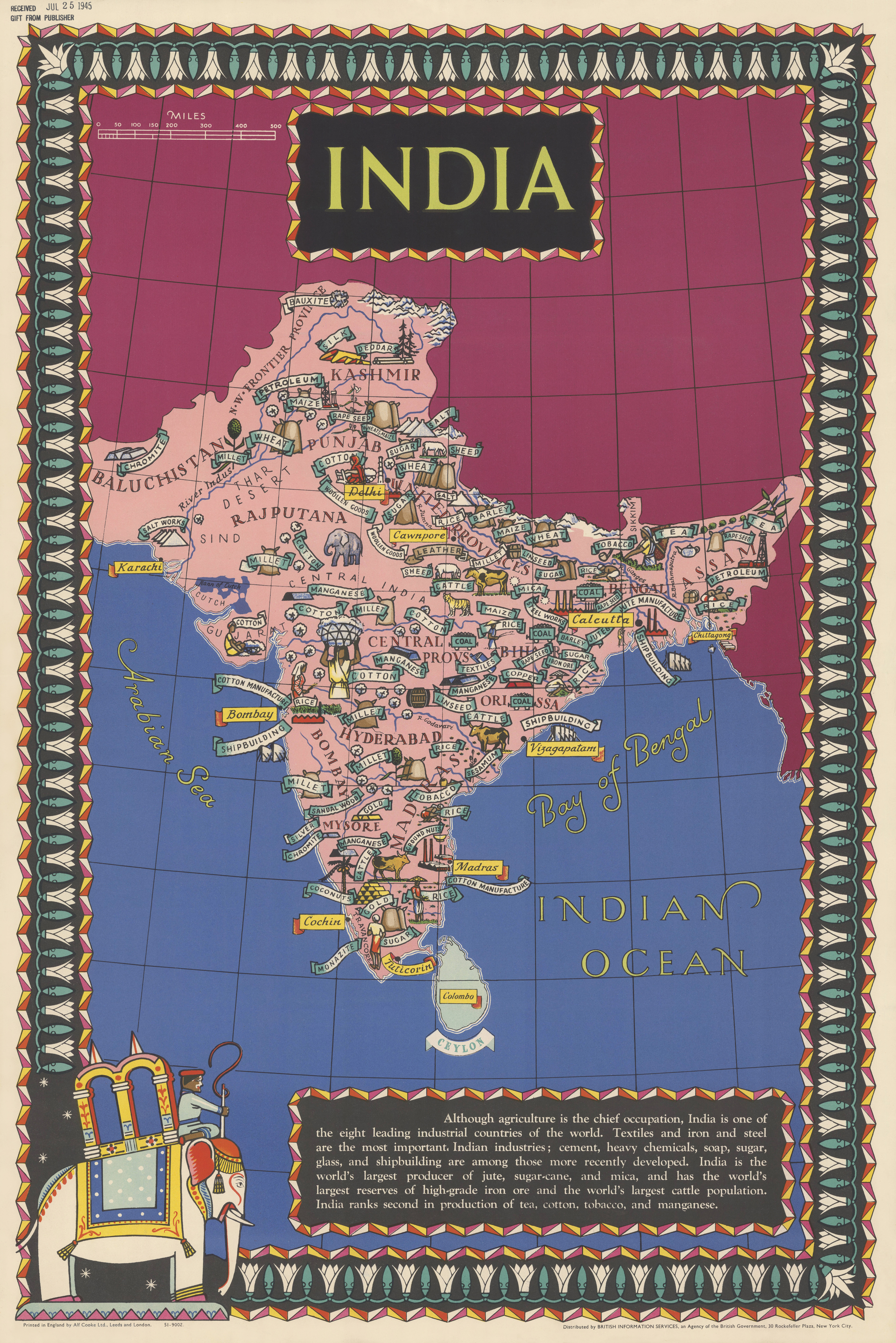
Map of colonial India, distributed by the British Information Services (1942)

British Information Services (BIS) was an overt propaganda organization that was part of the Foreign and Commonwealth Office of the government of the United Kingdom.

BIS was initially formed in 1941 as an organization to promote British interests in the United States. It was later expanded to operate in countries around the world, eventually expanding to have a presence in around 40 countries, attached to British embassies.

The U.S. operations of BIS had a headquarters in Washington, D.C., with offices in New York, Chicago and San Francisco. The New York office had a budget of £240,786 in 1949.

“The British Library of Information in New York: A Tool of British Foreign Policy, 1919-1942.” outlines the library's early history.

== See also ==
- British Security Co-ordination, a British black propaganda operation founded in 1940
