= Benjamin deForest Bayly =

Canadian electrical engineer

Benjamin deForest "Pat" Bayly (June 20, 1903 – 1994) was a Canadian electrical engineer and a professor at the University of Toronto. During World War II he invented a cypher machine called the Rockex and handled communications at the secret intelligence base Camp X. He later ran an engineering company in Ajax, Ontario, and was the first mayor of that town. A street there is named after him.

== Early life and education ==
Bayly was born in London, Ontario, son of Benjamin Moore Bayly and Alice Seaborn. He grew up in Moose Jaw, Saskatchewan, where his father worked as a medical health officer. He studied electrical engineering at the University of Toronto, and lectured there on radio communications before graduation. He graduated in 1930 with a BA in Science.

== Career ==
After graduation Bayly was hired as an assistant professor in the University of Toronto's Department of Electrical Engineering, lecturing on radio communication, and later became a professor there.

During World War II, Bayly was recruited by William Stephenson's British Security Coordination (BSC) to help with Stephenson's transatlantic communications from New York to Britain. He soon set up the telecommunications centre, code named Hydra, at Canada's secret intelligence installation, Camp X, near Whitby, Ontario. Bayly (often called Pat) was assistant director, with a British army rank of lieutenant colonel. Hydra sent and received Allied radio signals from around the world. Encryption using existing equipment was very slow, so Bayly invented a much faster solution for the purpose, an offline, one-time tape cipher machine labelled the Rockex or "Telekrypton". A later version of the machine was used by British consulates and embassies until 1973.

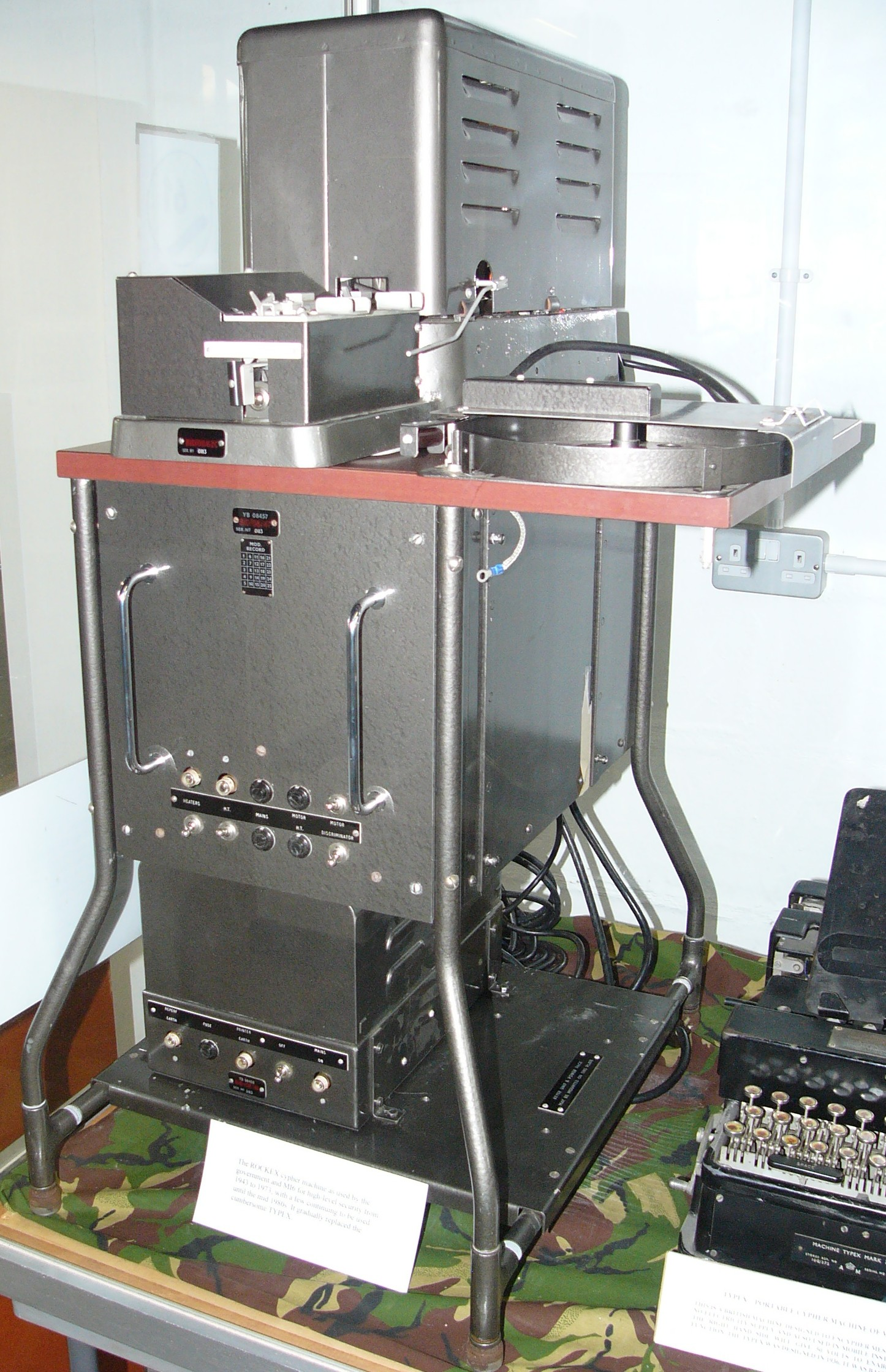
Rockex equipment invented by Benjamin deForest Bayly

The Government of Canada states that Hydra provided "an essential tactical and strategic component of the larger Allied radio network, secret information was transmitted securely to and from Canada, Great Britain, other Commonwealth countries and the United States".

The Hydra station was valuable for both coding and decoding information in relative safety from the prying ears of German radio observers and Nazi detection. Hydra also had direct access via land lines to Ottawa, New York City and Washington, D.C. for telegraph and telephone communications. The main transmitter was previously used as that of American AM station WCAU's shortwave sibling W3XAU, and upon severance of W3XAU in 1941, the transmitter was refurbished and became the transmitter for Hydra at Camp X. Other radio apparatus was purchased discreetly from amateur radio enthusiasts, brought to the building in pieces and assembled on site.

After the war, Bayly returned to work as a professor at the University of Toronto until 1950, when he set up his own company, Bayly Engineering Works, in the newly formed town of Ajax, Ontario. Soon after, Bayly served as the first Mayor of the town. As well as having a street in the town named after him, in 2016 a statue commemorating his life was commissioned by the town.

Bayly later sold his company and retired in California. A book about his life, Benjamin de Forest (Pat) Bayly the Unknown Canadian, has been written by Bill Parish. Bayly talks about his work during the war and his relationship with Gordon Welchman and Alan Turing in Bill Macdonald's book The True Intrepid.
