= William Stephenson =

Canadian spymaster (1897–1989)

Sir William Stephenson CC MC DFC
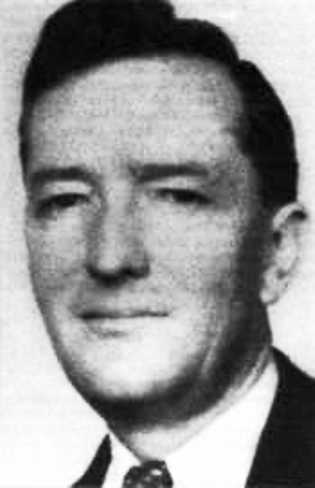
- 1942 passport photo
- Born: William Samuel Clouston Stanger; 23 January 1897; Winnipeg, Manitoba, Canada
- Died: 31 January 1989 (aged 92); Paget, Bermuda
- Other name: "Little Bill"
- Occupations: Soldier; fighter pilot; businessman; spymaster
- Awards: Knight Bachelor; Companion of the Order of Canada; Military Cross; Distinguished Flying Cross; Medal for Merit
- Espionage activity
- Allegiance: Canada; United Kingdom
- Service branch: Canadian Expeditionary Force; Royal Flying Corps; British Security Coordination
- Rank: Captain
- Codename: Intrepid
- Operations: World War I World War II

Sir William Samuel Stephenson CC MC DFC (born William Samuel Clouston Stanger, 23 January 1897 – 31 January 1989) was a Canadian soldier, fighter pilot, businessman and spymaster who served as the senior representative of British Security Coordination (BSC) for the Western Allies during World War II. He is best known by his wartime intelligence code name, Intrepid. Many people consider him to be one of the real-life inspirations for James Bond. Ian Fleming himself once wrote, "James Bond is a highly romanticised version of a true spy. The real thing is... William Stephenson."

As head of the BSC, Stephenson handed British scientific secrets over to Franklin D. Roosevelt and relayed American secrets back to Winston Churchill. In addition, Stephenson has been credited with changing American public opinion from an isolationist stance to a supportive tendency regarding the United States' entry into World War II.

== Early life ==
Stephenson was born William Samuel Clouston Stanger on 23 January 1897, in Point Douglas, Winnipeg, Manitoba. His mother was Icelandic, and his father was Scottish from the Orkney Islands. Water Street in Winnipeg was renamed in his honour to William Stephenson Way.

He left school at a young age and worked as a telegrapher. In January 1916, during World War I, he volunteered for service in the 101st Overseas Battalion (Winnipeg Light Infantry), Canadian Expeditionary Force. He left for England on RMS Olympic on 29 June 1916, arriving on 6 July 1916. The 101st Battalion was broken up in England, and he was transferred to the 17th Reserve Battalion in East Sandling, Kent. On 17 July, he was transferred to the Canadian Engineer Training Depot. He was attached to the Sub Staff, Canadian Training Depot Headquarters, in Shorncliffe, and was promoted to Sergeant (with pay of Clerk) in May 1917. In June 1917 he was "on command" to the Cadet Wing of the Royal Flying Corps at Denham Barracks, Buckinghamshire.

On 15 August 1917, Stephenson was officially struck off the strength of the Canadian Expeditionary Force and granted a commission in Britain's Royal Flying Corps. Posted to 73 Squadron on 9 February 1918, he flew the Sopwith Camel biplane fighter and scored 12 victories to become a flying ace before he was shot down and crashed his plane behind enemy lines on 28 July 1918. During the incident Stephenson was injured by fire from a German ace pilot, Justus Grassmann, by friendly fire (according to a French observer), or by both. In any event, he was subsequently captured by the Germans and held as a prisoner of war until allegedly escaping in October 1918. His Royal Air Force (RAF) Service file indicates that he was repatriated from the Holzminden prisoner-of-war camp on 9 December 1918.

By the end of World War I, Stephenson had achieved the rank of Captain and earned the Military Cross and the Distinguished Flying Cross. His medal citations perhaps foreshadow his later achievements, and read:

For conspicuous gallantry and devotion to duty. When flying low and observing an open staff car on a road, he attacked it with such success that later it was seen lying in the ditch upside down. During the same flight he caused a stampede amongst some enemy transport horses on a road. Previous to this he had destroyed a hostile scout and a two-seater plane. His work has been of the highest order, and he has shown the greatest courage and energy in engaging every kind of target.

— Military Cross citation, Supplement to the London Gazette, 21 June 1918.

This officer has shown conspicuous gallantry and skill in attacking enemy troops and transports from low altitudes, causing heavy casualties. His reports, also, have contained valuable and precise information. He has further proved himself a keen antagonist in the air, having, during recent operations, accounted for six enemy aeroplanes.

— Distinguished Flying Cross citation, Supplement to the London Gazette, 21 September 1918.

== Interwar period ==
After World War I, Stephenson returned to Manitoba and with a friend, Wilf Russell, started a hardware business, inspired largely by a can opener that Stephenson had taken from his POW camp. The business was unsuccessful, and he left Canada for England. In England, Stephenson soon became wealthy, with business contacts in many countries. In 1924, he married American tobacco heiress Mary French Simmons, of Springfield, Tennessee. That same year, Stephenson and George William Walton patented a system for transmitting photographic images via wireless that produced £100,000 a year in royalties for the 18-year run of the patent (about $12 million per annum adjusted for inflation in 2010). In addition to his patent royalties, Stephenson swiftly diversified into several lucrative industries: radio manufacturing (General Radio Company Limited); aircraft manufacturing (General Aircraft Limited); Pressed Steel Company that manufactured car bodies for the British motor industry; construction and cement, as well as Shepperton Studios and Earls Court. Stephenson had a broad base of industrial contacts in Europe, Britain and North America, as well as a large group of contacts in the international film industry. Shepperton Studios were the largest film studios in the world outside of Hollywood.

As early as April 1936, Stephenson was voluntarily providing confidential information to British MP Winston Churchill about how Adolf Hitler's Nazi government was building up its armed forces and hiding military expenditures of £800,000,000. This was a clear violation of the terms of the Treaty of Versailles and showed the growing Nazi threat to European and international security. Churchill used Stephenson's information (as well as from other sources) in Parliament to warn against the appeasement policies of the government of Neville Chamberlain.

== World War II ==
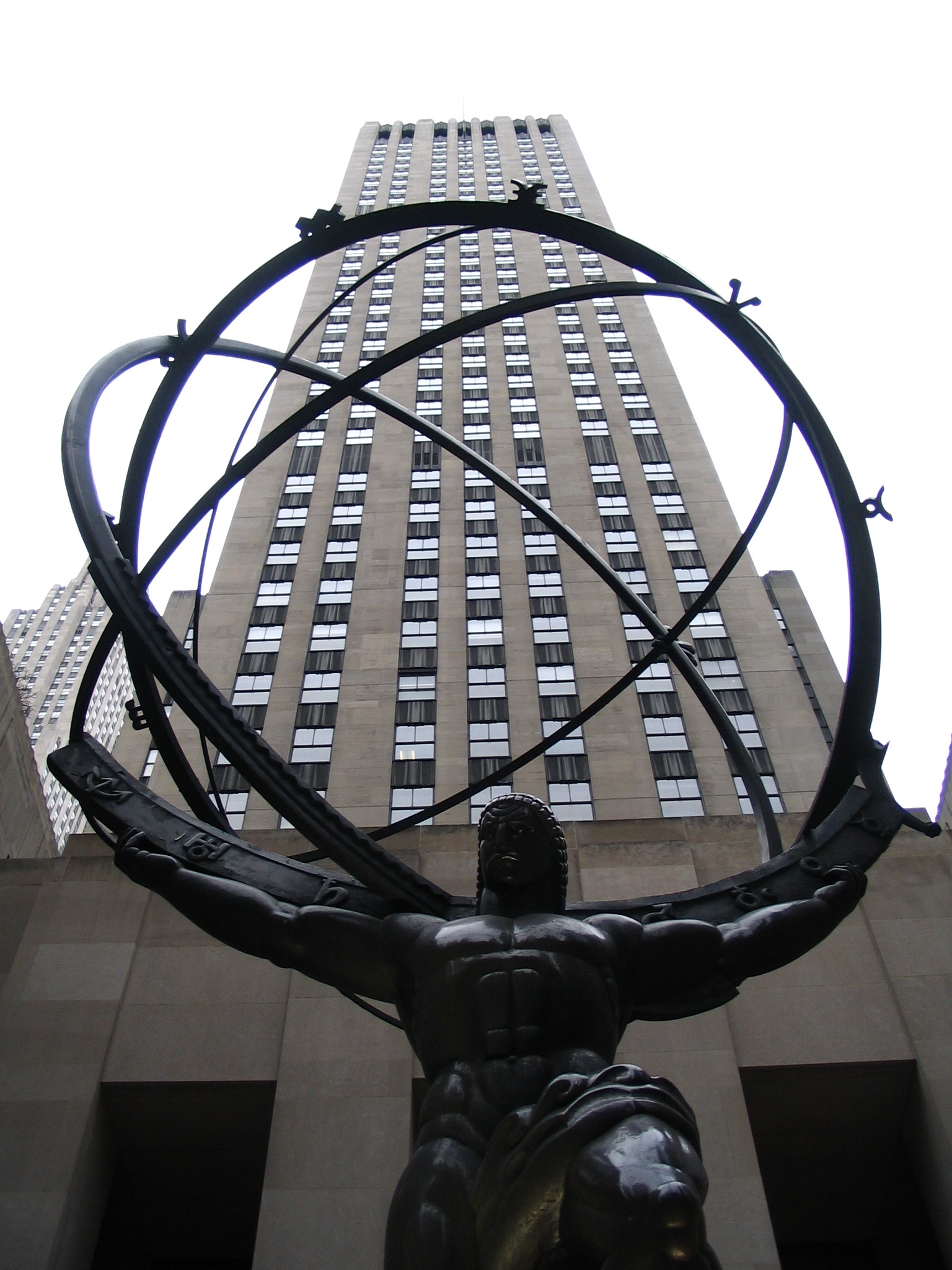
BSC was housed on the 35th and 36th floors of the International Building, Rockefeller Center, New York City

After World War II began (and over the objections of Sir Stewart Menzies, wartime head of British intelligence) now-Prime Minister Winston Churchill sent Stephenson to the United States on 21 June 1940, to covertly establish and run British Security Coordination (BSC) in New York City, over a year before U.S. entry into the war.

His deputy at BSC was the Australian-born MI6 intelligence officer Dick Ellis, who has been credited with writing the blueprint for William Donovan's Coordinator of Information and the Office of Strategic Services. Ellis wrote an Historical Note for William Stevenson's 1976 biography of Stephenson, A Man Called Intrepid.

BSC was registered by the State Department as a foreign entity. It operated out of Room 3603 at Rockefeller Center and was officially known as the British Passport Control Office from which it had expanded. BSC acted as the administrative headquarters more than the operational one for the Secret Intelligence Service (MI6) and the Special Operations Executive (SOE) and was a channel for communications and liaison between US and British security and intelligence organisations.

Stephenson's initial directives for BSC were to

1. investigate enemy activities;
2. institute security measures against sabotage to British property; and
3. organize American public opinion in favour of aid to Britain.

Later this was expanded to include "the assurance of American participation in secret activities throughout the world in the closest possible collaboration with the British". Stephenson's official title was British Passport Control Officer. His unofficial mission was to create a secret British intelligence network throughout the western hemisphere, and to operate covertly and broadly on behalf of the British government and the Allies in aid of winning the war.

Stephenson was soon a close adviser to Roosevelt, and suggested that he put Stephenson's good friend William J. "Wild Bill" Donovan in charge of all U.S. intelligence services. Donovan founded the U.S. Office of Strategic Services (OSS), which in 1947 would become the Central Intelligence Agency (CIA). As senior representative of British intelligence in the Western Hemisphere, Stephenson was one of the few persons in the hemisphere who were authorized to view raw Ultra transcripts of German Enigma ciphers that had been decrypted at Britain's Bletchley Park facility. He was trusted by Churchill to decide what Ultra information to pass along to various branches of the U.S. and Canadian governments.

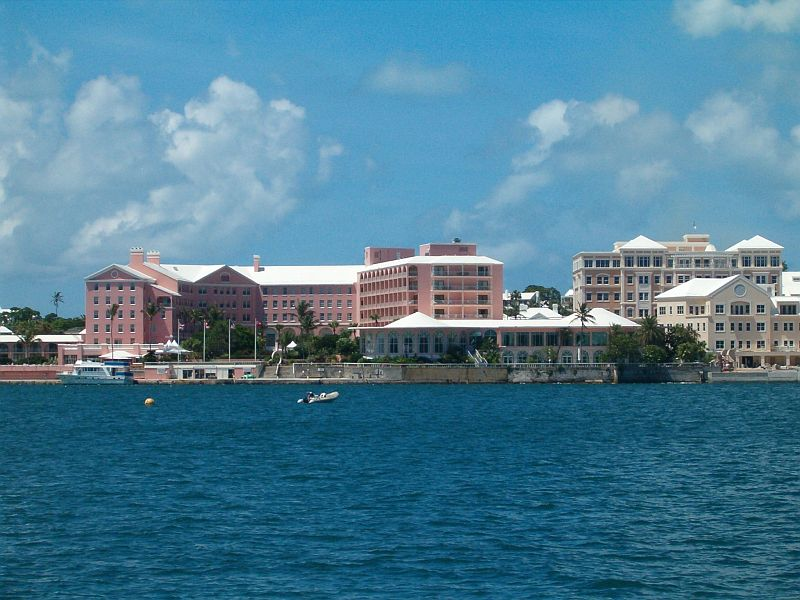
The Princess Hotel in Bermuda, home to British Imperial Censorship during the war, and to Sir William Stephenson after the war.

While it was still neutral, agreement was made for all trans-Atlantic mails from the U.S. to be routed through the British colony of Bermuda, 640 miles off the North Carolina coast. Airmails carried by both British and American aircraft were landed at RAF Darrell's Island and delivered to 1,200 censors of British Imperial Censorship, part of BSC, working in the Princess Hotel. All mail, radio and telegraphic traffic bound for Europe, the U.S. and the Far East were intercepted and analyzed by 1,200 censors, of British Imperial Censorship, part of British Security Coordination (BSC), before being routed to their destination with no indication that they had been read. With BSC working closely with the FBI, the censors were responsible for the discovery and arrest of a number of Axis spies operating in the US, including the Joe K ring.

After the war, Stephenson lived at the Princess Hotel for a time before buying his own home in Bermuda.

Under Stephenson, BSC directly influenced U.S. media (including newspaper columns by Walter Winchell and Drew Pearson), and media in other hemisphere countries, toward pro-British and anti-Axis views. Once the U.S. had entered the war in December 1941, BSC went on to train U.S. propagandists from the United States Office of War Information in Canada. BSC covert intelligence and propaganda efforts directly affected wartime developments in Brazil, Argentina, Colombia, Chile, Venezuela, Peru, Bolivia, Paraguay, Mexico, the Central American countries, Bermuda, Cuba and Puerto Rico.

Stephenson worked without salary.

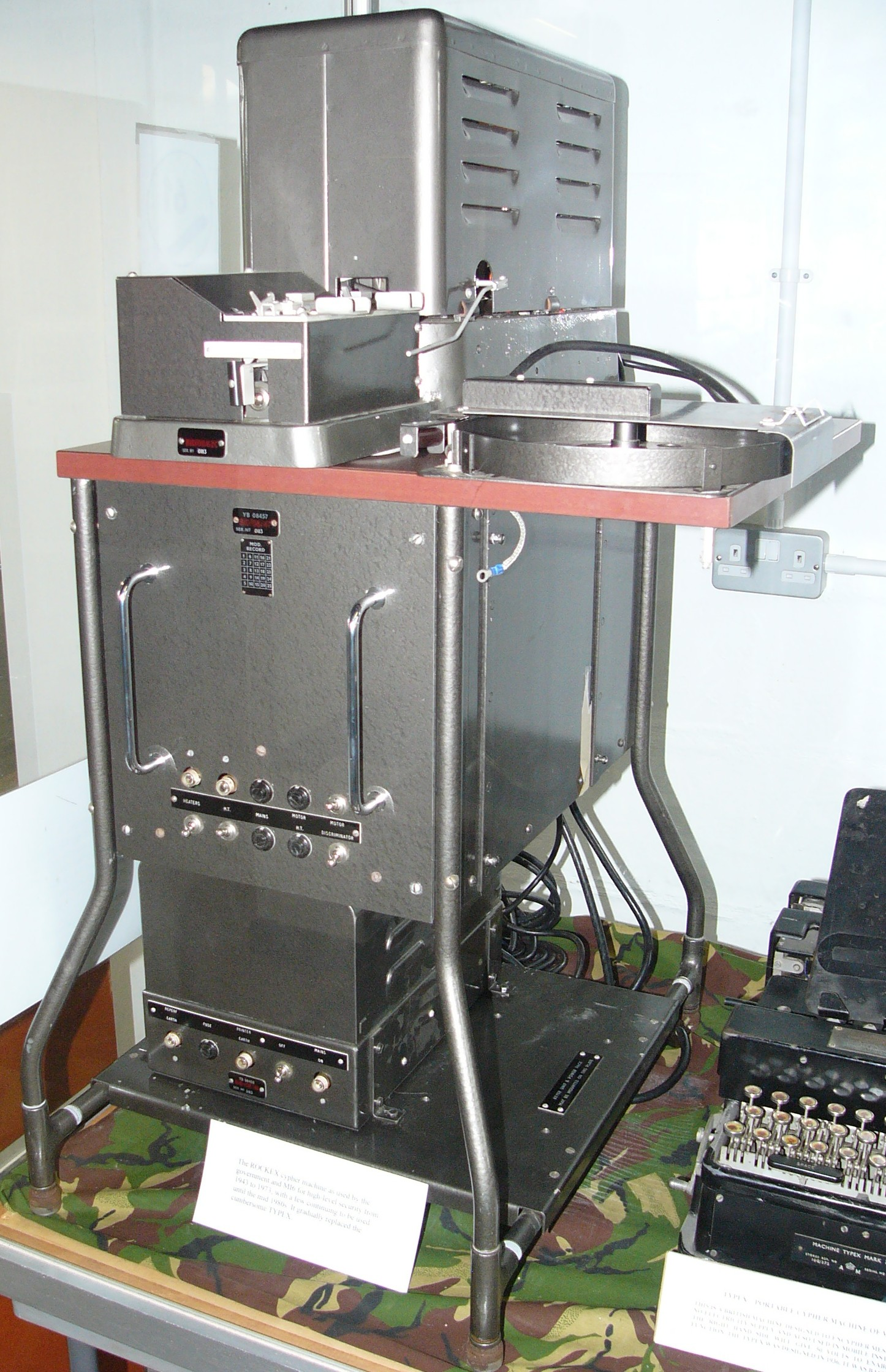
The Rockex was an IBM Telex machine adapted by Pat Bayly to operate on a one time cypher, allowing secure communication among the Allies throughout the war. It continued to be used in peacetime until the 1970s.

He hired hundreds of people, mostly Canadian women, to staff his organization and covered much of the expense out of his own pocket. His employees included secretive communications genius Benjamin deForest "Pat" Bayly and future advertising wizard David Ogilvy. Stephenson employed Amy Elizabeth Thorpe, codenamed CYNTHIA, to seduce Vichy French officials into giving up Enigma ciphers and secrets from their Washington embassy. At the height of the war Bayly, a University of Toronto professor from Moose Jaw, created the Rockex, the fast secure communications system that would eventually be relied on by all the Allies.

Not least of Stephenson's contributions to the war effort was the setting up by BSC of Camp X, the unofficial name of the secret Special Training School No. 103, a Second World War paramilitary installation for training covert agents in the methods required for success in clandestine operations. Located in Whitby, Ontario, this was the first such training school in North America. Estimates vary, but between 500 and 2,000 British, Canadian and American covert operators were trained there from 1941 to 1945.

Reports indicate that Camp X graduates worked as "secret agents, security personnel, intelligence officers, or psychological warfare experts, serving in clandestine operations. Many were captured, tortured, and executed; survivors received no individual recognition for their efforts." Camp X graduates operated in Europe (Spain, Portugal, Italy and the Balkans) as well as in Africa, Australia, India and the Pacific. They may have included Ian Fleming (though there is evidence to the contrary), future author of the James Bond books. It has been said that the fictional Goldfinger's raid on Fort Knox was inspired by a Stephenson plan (never carried out) to steal $2,883,000,000 in Vichy French gold reserves from the French Caribbean colony of Martinique.

BSC purchased a ten-kilowatt transmitter from Philadelphia radio station WCAU and installed it at Camp X. By mid-1944, Hydra (as the Camp X transmitter was known) was transmitting 30,000 and receiving 9,000 message groups daily – much of the secret Allied intelligence traffic across the Atlantic.

== Honours ==
For his extraordinary service to the war effort, he was made a Knight Bachelor by King George VI in the 1945 New Year Honours. In recommending Stephenson for the knighthood, Winston Churchill wrote: "This one is dear to my heart."

In November 1946 Stephenson received the Medal for Merit from President Harry S. Truman, at that time the highest U.S. civilian award. He was the first non-American to be so honoured. General "Wild Bill" Donovan presented the medal. The citation paid tribute to Stephenson's "valuable assistance to America in the fields of intelligence and special operations". The first non-American was the Belgian Edgar Sengier on 9 April 1946

The "Quiet Canadian" was recognized by his native land late: he was made a Companion of the Order of Canada on 17 December 1979, and invested in the Order on 5 February 1980.

On 2 May 2000, CIA Executive Director David W. Carey, representing Director of Central Intelligence George Tenet and Deputy Director John A. Gordon, accepted from the Intrepid Society of Winnipeg, Manitoba, a bronze statuette of Stephenson. In his remarks, Carey said:

Sir William Stephenson played a key role in the creation of the CIA. He realized early on that America needed a strong intelligence organization and lobbied contacts close to President Roosevelt to appoint a U.S. "coordinator" to oversee FBI and military intelligence. He urged that the job be given to William J. "Wild Bill" Donovan, who had recently toured British defences and gained the confidence of Prime Minister Winston Churchill. Although Roosevelt didn't establish exactly what Sir William had in mind, the organization created represented a revolutionary step in the history of American intelligence. Donovan's Office of Strategic Services was the first "central" U.S. intelligence service. OSS worked closely with and learned from Sir William and other Canadian and British officials during the war. A little later, these OSS officers formed the core of the CIA. Intrepid may not have technically been the father of CIA, but he's certainly in our lineage someplace.

On 8 August 2008, Stephenson was recognized for his work by Major General John M. Custer, Commandant of the U.S. Army Intelligence Corps. Custer inducted him as an honorary member of the U.S. Army Intelligence Corps, an honour shared by only two other non-Americans.

== Legacy ==
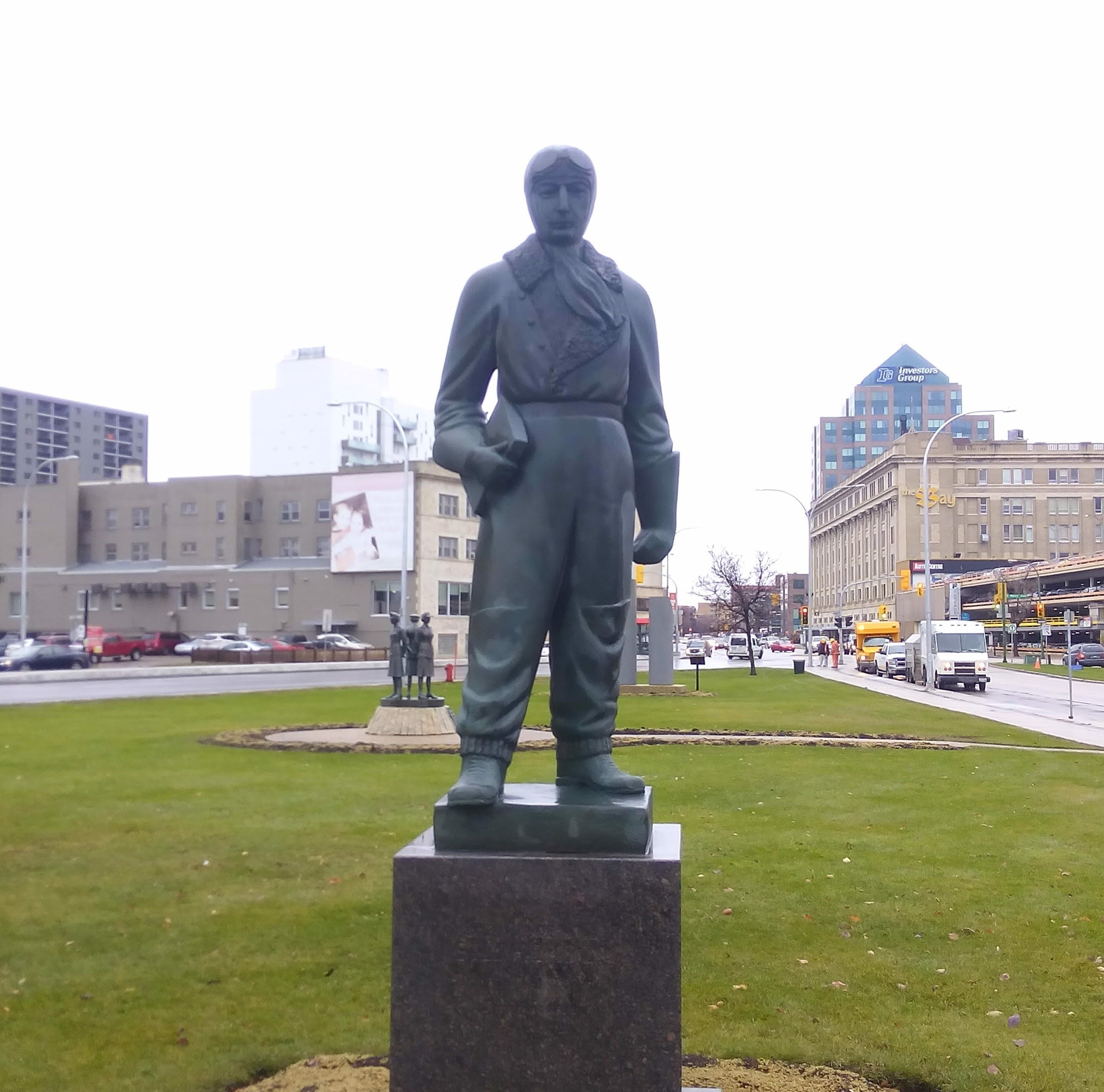
The William Stephenson statue near Memorial Boulevard in downtown Winnipeg.

In 1997, a new public library built in Winnipeg was named for him, after a vote was held to choose the name of the new library. Leo Mol donated a miniature of his statue of Stephenson to the library.

On 24 July 1999, The Princess Royal unveiled, in Stephenson's hometown of Winnipeg, Manitoba, near the Provincial Legislature on York Street, Leo Mol's life-sized bronze statue of Stephenson in military aviator uniform. The monument is dedicated to Stephenson's memory and achievements.

On 15 November 2009, Water Avenue in downtown Winnipeg was renamed William Stephenson Way.

Whitby, Ontario has a street named for Stephenson. It connects with streets named Intrepid and Overlord. The town is also home to Sir William Stephenson Public School, which opened in 2004.

In Oshawa, Ontario, Branch 637 of the Royal Canadian Legion is named for Stephenson. Intrepid Park, named after Stephenson's wartime code name, is located in southern Oshawa near the original Camp X site. A historic plaque erected at the park reads as follows:

On this site British Security Co-ordination operated Special Training School No. 103 and Hydra. S.T.S. 103 trained Allied agents in the techniques of secret warfare for the Special Operations Executive (SOE) branch of the British Intelligence Service. Hydra Network communicated vital messages between Canada, the United States and Great Britain. This commemoration is dedicated to the service of the men and women who took part in these operations.

In Memory of Sir William Stephenson 'The Man Called Intrepid'

Born at Winnipeg, Manitoba, 11 January 1896. Died at Paget, Bermuda, 31 January 1989. Director of British Security Co-ordination. 1941–1946.

== Disputes ==
In 1976 British-born Canadian author William Stevenson published a biography of Stephenson, A Man Called Intrepid. Some of the book's statements have been called into question; in a review the same year, Hugh Trevor-Roper wrote that "This book ... is, from start to finish, utterly worthless," while other former intelligence personnel and historians criticized the book for inaccuracies. Nigel West's 1998 book Counterfeit Spies asserts that "Intrepid" was probably not Stephenson's codename, but BSC's telegraphic address in New York. Stevenson was a frequent visitor to Bermuda, where Stephenson had taken up residence during and after the war. He was an ex-naval officer, having served in the Fleet Air Arm during the war with prominent Bermudian lawyer William Kempe (a founding partner of Appleby, Spurling & Kempe), a prominent Bermudian law firm (another author and frequent visitor to Bermuda was ex-naval officer Ian Fleming).

Intelligence historian David A. T. Stafford asserts that a more reliable source on Stephenson's career is H. Montgomery Hyde's The Quiet Canadian, published in 1962, before Stevenson's book.

In 1998, another account of Stephenson's life was published in Bill Macdonald's The True Intrepid, with a foreword by the late CIA staff historian Thomas Troy. The book clears up the spymaster's fictitious background in Winnipeg and contains oral histories from his ex-agents. Macdonald's book includes a chapter on the secretive communications genius Benjamin deForest "Pat" Bayly, who according to Stafford's book Camp X – refused to speak with Stafford. Bayly is not mentioned in The Quiet Canadian or A Man Called Intrepid.

1. In Counterfeit Spies, Bermuda resident Rupert Allason (Nigel West) reports that no record exists of Stephenson having received the French Croix de guerre avec Palmes or the Légion d'honneur. Stephenson was of course awarded Britain's Military Cross and Distinguished Flying Cross for his heroics in France. In September 2009 his medals and other effects were displayed in Manitoba's legislative building, in Winnipeg.
2. William Stevenson describes a dinner held at Lord Beaverbrook's house in May or June 1940 which Stephenson purportedly attended. Churchill's private secretary Jock Colville casts doubt on Stevenson's account, pointing out that the invitation that Churchill supposedly sent Stephenson was clearly a forgery. The highly punctilious Churchill would never have called Beaverbrook "the beaver", and he would never have signed himself "W.C." (the abbreviation for "water closet)." Moreover, Stevenson reports that Lord Trenchard chatted with Stephenson about his own fighter plane; however, in 1940 Trenchard was over 65 years old and was retired from the military. In author William Stevenson's papers at the University of Regina there is a reference to the Beaverbrook dinner, noting that in later years Stephenson had cabled the author that he did not recall the exact date of the gathering. There is no mention of Stephenson having received an invitation from Churchill.
3. In his 1981 book The Churchillians, Jock Colville took issue with Stevenson's description of Stephenson's wartime relations with Churchill. Colville pointed out that Stephenson was not Churchill's personal liaison with Roosevelt, that in fact (as is well known) the two leaders corresponded directly. Indeed, Colville contends that he never heard Churchill speak of Stephenson (which may say as much about Churchill's relations with Colville, an Assistant Private Secretary, as it does about his relations with the spy Stephenson). Based on this and other questions, Colville expressed the hope that Stevenson's book would not be "used for the purpose of historical reference." Meanwhile, numerous other references to a Stephenson-Churchill connection can be found; for example, in Maclean's magazine, 17 December 1952, and The Times, 21 October 1962. The relationship is also referenced in Hyde's biography of Stephenson, The Quiet Canadian (1962). In addition, British–Soviet double agent Kim Philby, in his book My Silent War, refers to Stephenson as a friend of Churchill's. Stephenson's personal secretary and personal cipher clerks mention Stephenson-Churchill communications in The True Intrepid and in the documentary film Secret Secretaries. In CIA historian Thomas Troy's book Wild Bill and Intrepid, there is a chapter on the relationship based on several direct interviews conducted by the author with Stephenson on Bermuda which discounts much of the criticism of West and Hugh Trevor-Roper.

== In popular culture ==
In 1979 Stephenson was portrayed by David Niven in the miniseries A Man Called Intrepid, based on William Stevenson's bestseller, A Man Called Intrepid.

Stephenson is the subject of the 2023 Canadian television documentary Shadow Man: William Stephenson and the Art of Political Warfare.

In 2027, the Royal Manitoba Theatre Centre is producing a new play (written by Canadian playwright Alex Poch-Goldin), Intrepid, based on the life and career of William Stephenson.
