= Radio Security Service =

Wartime civilian radio efforts

The Radio Security Service (RSS) was a wartime Y service (tactical wireless intelligence) tasked with intercepting the traffic of the German intelligence services and their undercover operatives within Britain during World War II. Most notably, the RSS employed civilian amateur radio operators as "volunteer interceptors" to augment the existing radio interception efforts of the military and intelligence services.

== Administrative history ==
Oversight of the RSS shifted between several bodies during the war. It began in 1939 under the auspices of the Illicit Wireless Intercept unit set up by the War Office. Later that year it was designated first MI1(g) and then MI8(c). Whilst part of MI8, the RSS worked closely with the Secret Intelligence Service (MI6) and, until 1940, was located with MI5 at HM Prison Wormwood Scrubs. In May 1941, it was transferred to MI6 control under its Section VIII (Communications) where it was designated Special Communications Unit 3, under the command of Edward Maltby. It was during this period that the RSS was moved to a new headquarters at Arkley View near Barnet, north London. After joining MI6 the Radio Security Section became known as the Radio Security Service.

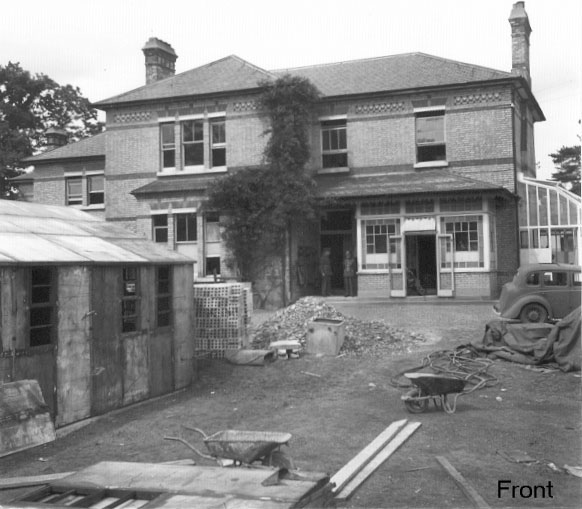
Arkley View, 1943

== Volunteer interceptors ==
Radio amateurs with advanced morse code skills were recruited by the Radio Society of Great Britain to serve as interceptors. Whilst amateurs had been banned from transmitting during the Second World War, they were still able to receive transmissions. Amateur stations were well placed to address propagation skip zones that hampered the interception of Axis messages transmitted from within the UK. A network of amateur stations were spread across the UK at distances of 10-15 miles. Operators were instructed to monitor specific frequencies at specific times and keep a log of all unusual signals. Signal reports would be sent back to Arkley View for scrutiny. Operators would receive feedback and further instructions on signals deemed to be useful.

Among their activities, volunteer interceptors transcribed transmissions from British agents, French resistance fighters and German spies within Britain. Also, coded transmissions by the Abwehr, Germany's military intelligence service, were recorded - with output sent to Bletchley Park.

By the end of the war, there were 1200 VI operators spread around the country.

== Other work ==
Production of the Rockex II cipher machines was done by the Radio Security Service at Hanslope Park until 31 December 1946, under Brigadier Sir Richard Gambier-Parry.

== Bibliography ==
- Abrutat, David (2019). Radio War: The Secret Espionage War of the Radio Security Service 1938–1946. Stroud: Fonthill Media Ltd. ISBN 978-1-78155-759-4.
