= Richard Melville Brooker =

British intelligence officer (1909-1994)

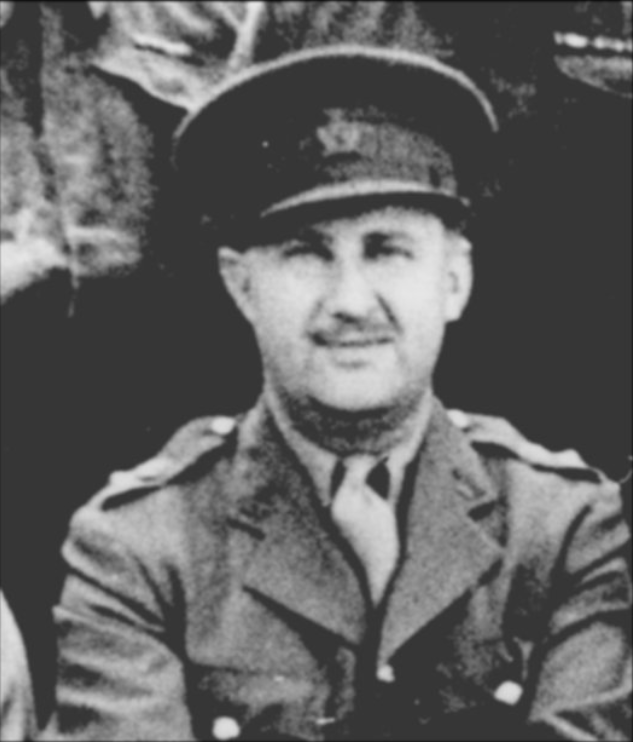
- Nicknames: "Bill Brooker"; "R.M. Brooker"
- Born: 23 September 1909; Paris
- Died: 1994 (aged 84)
- Buried: Sicklinghall Cemetery, Harrogate Borough, North Yorkshire, England
- Allegiance: United Kingdom
- Branch: British Army; Special Operations Executive; Secret Intelligence Service; British Security Coordination; Office of the Coordinator of Information; Office of Strategic Services
- Rank: Lieutenant Colonel
- Commands: Chief Instructor, Beaulieu; Commandant, Camp X
- Conflicts: World War II

Richard Melville "Bill" Brooker was a British soldier, spy instructor, and commando during World War II, and integral to the Allied effort in defeating the Axis. He was a member of Churchill's Special Operations Executive (SOE), and Commandant of Camp X, where he trained the men and women who would become the leaders of the Office of the Coordinator of Information (COI), which became the Office of Strategic Services (OSS), a precursor to the Central Intelligence Agency (CIA). He is considered one of the fathers of modern American central intelligence, and gained the admiration of William J. Donovan and Allen Dulles, and even is mentioned as being a great instructor of spies in the memoirs of Kim Philby.

== Early life ==
Brooker was born on 23 December 1909 in Paris, France, son of Richard William Brooker, of Mill Hill London. manager of travel agency Thomas Cook & Son's Paris office. In the years before World War II, Brooker was employed by a Mincing Lane-based merchant in the City of London, later joining Nestlé at their headquarters in Switzerland and becoming a travelling salesman, working extensively across Europe. Prior to the war, Brooker joined the Force Service Protectorate.

== World War II ==
On March 18, 1941, Brooker joined the SOE's training section, and trained scores of SOE operatives at Beaulieu on espionage and tradecraft prior to their departure to fight the Axis.

In December 1941, Brooker was sent to Canada aboard the SS Pasteur with Lieutenant Colonel Roper Caldbeck to become the second in command of STS 103, or what is more commonly known today as Camp X.

In August 1942, Brooker succeeded Roper Caldbeck as Commandant of Camp X. He is said to have been the school's most popular commanding officer to this point.

Bickham Sweet-Escott wrote:

"I have no doubt that OSS (Office of Strategic Services) got much more out of our training school in Canada, (Camp X) than from all the efforts of our party in Washington... What was unique about Oshawa was the personality of the commandant, Lieutenant-Colonel Brooker. Bill Brooker was a born salesman. He was a brilliant and convincing lecturer, and he had an immense wealth of stories from the real life of a secret agent to illustrate his points."

Brooker was noted as an unconventional instructor - he would occasionally interrupt his classes with exercises, including gunfire and other scenarios, and would ask his students to recall details like the number of shots fired and the caliber of the weapon. He also gave them much sage advice: “If there's anything loose in the intelligence business, you're dead!”

Brooker also trained OSS executives on the weekends on the fundamentals of training, creating "trained trainers" out of them.

In the Winter of 1942, Brooker helped Garland H. Williams to completely redesign the training curriculum of the COI/OSS.

Brooker also assisted, along with British Navy Commander N.G.A. Woolley, Millard Preston Goodfellow and William J. Donovan at the COI in creating an amphibious warfare training unit, that would become the OSS Maritime Unit training center.

In March 1943, Brooker was reassigned to the OSS in Washington, D.C.

Later in the year, William Donovan had Brooker deployed to Algeria to participate in joint SOE/OSS operations there.

In 1944, Brooker would spend more time in Washington and New York, dividing his time in half between the two OSS operations, helping both to instruct students and build secret interception systems of German intelligences.

== Subsequent career ==
Brooker had a successful career in the travel business, becoming the controlling shareholder and managing director of the Henry Lunn travel company. Several other enterprises were eventually bought out. He had short periods of retirement in Montreux and New York, but finally retired in 1977, by which time he had co-founded the Association of British Travel Agents and served on its first council.

== Personal life ==
In 1947, Brooker married Margaret Cressida, daughter of Captain Charles Johnstone-Scott, of the East Yorkshire Regiment, grandson of the politician Sir John Vanden-Bempde-Johnstone 2nd Baronet. They had two sons. They lived at Medstead House, Alton, Hampshire, and later at The Burrells, Appleby, Westmorland.
