= British Security Co-ordination =

British intelligence agency

British Security Coordination
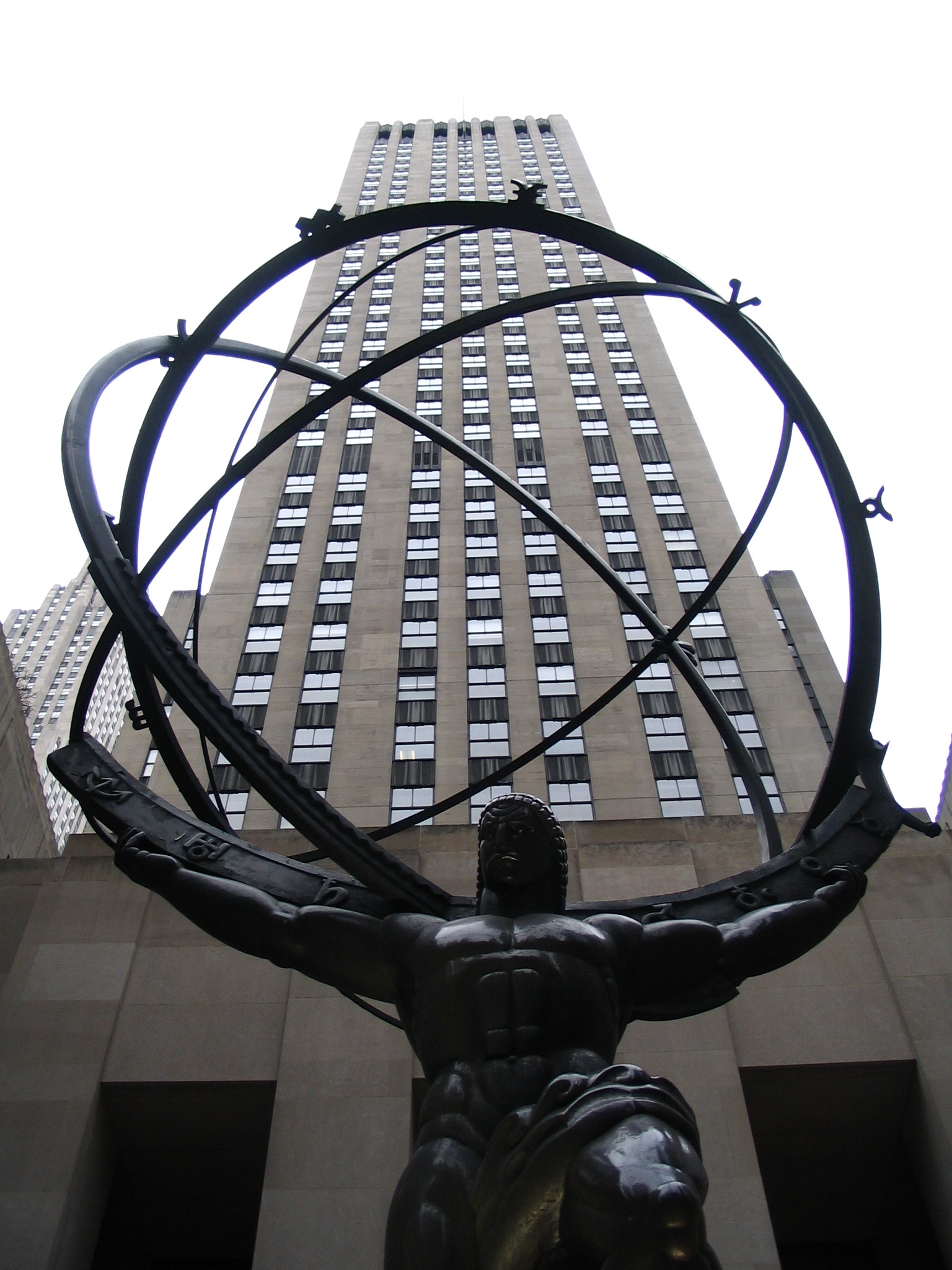
- BSC operated from the 35th and 36th floors of the International Building, Rockefeller Center, New York

Agency overview
- Formed: May 1940
- Dissolved: 1945
- Jurisdiction: Western Hemisphere
- Headquarters: Rockefeller Plaza, New York City
- Minister responsible: Winston Churchill
- Agency executive: William Stephenson, Chief
- Parent agency: Secret Intelligence Service

British Security Co-ordination (BSC) was a covert organisation set up in New York City by the British Secret Intelligence Service (MI6) in May 1940 upon the authorisation of the Prime Minister, Winston Churchill.

Its purpose was to investigate enemy activities, prevent sabotage against British interests in the Americas, and mobilise pro-British opinion in the Americas. As a 'huge secret agency of nationwide news manipulation and black propaganda', the BSC influenced news coverage in the Herald Tribune, the New York Post, The Baltimore Sun, and Radio New York Worldwide. The stories disseminated from the organisation's offices at Rockefeller Center would then be legitimately picked up by other radio stations and newspapers, before being relayed to the American public. Through this, anti-German stories were placed in major American media outlets to help turn public opinion.

Its cover was the British Passport Control Office. BSC benefitted from support given by the chief of the US Office of Strategic Services, William J. Donovan (whose organisation was modelled on British activities), and US President Franklin D. Roosevelt.

== Beginnings ==
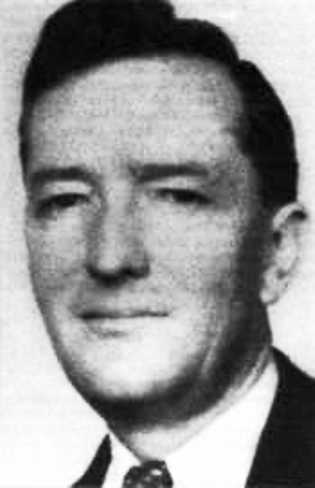
As head of the British Security Coordination, William Stephenson has been credited with changing American public opinion from an isolationist stance to a supportive tendency regarding America's entry into World War II.

The declaration of war upon Germany by the British in September 1939 forced a break in liaison between SIS (MI6) and the FBI because of the Neutrality Acts of 1930s. William Stephenson was sent to the US by the head of SIS to see if it could be rekindled to an extent that SIS could operate effectively in the US. While J. Edgar Hoover was sympathetic, he could not go against the State Department without the President's authorisation; he also believed that if it was authorised, it should be a personal liaison between Stephenson and himself without other departments being informed. However, Roosevelt endorsed co-operation.

Stephenson's deputy at BSC was Australian-born British intelligence officer Dick Ellis. The pair had been introduced by Sir Ralph Glyn.

Ellis said Stephenson 'had been providing a great deal of information on German rearmament to Mr Churchill at that time he was not in office [prior to May 1940] but was playing quite an important role in providing background information to members of [the] House of Commons who were much more concerned with what was happening than the administration [of Prime Minister Neville Chamberlain] seemed to be at the time... I introduced him to my own channels, to heads of intelligence. And that led to his being asked if he was going to America... if he would do what he could to reestablish a link between security authorities here and the FBI.’

The liaison was necessary because Britain's enemies were already present in the US and could expect sympathy and support from German and Italian immigrants, but the authorities there had no remit or interest in activities that were not directly against US security.

Stephenson's report on the American situation advocated a secret organisation acting beyond purely SIS activities and covering all covert operations that could be done to ensure aid to Britain and an eventual entry of the US into the war. Stephenson was given this remit and the traditional cover of appointment as a 'Passport Control Officer' which he took up in June 1940. Although the existing setup in New York was lacking, Stephenson could call upon his personal liaison with Hoover, the support of Canada, the British ambassador, and his acquaintances with US interventionists.

== Operation ==
The office, which was established for intelligence and propaganda services, was headed by Canadian industrialist William Stephenson. Its first tasks were to promote British interests in the United States, counter Nazi propaganda, and protect the Atlantic convoys from enemy sabotage.

The BSC was registered by the State Department as a foreign entity. It operated out of Room 3603 at Rockefeller Center and was officially known as the British Passport Control Office from which it had expanded. BSC acted as administrative headquarters more than operational one for SIS and the Special Operations Executive (SOE) and was a channel for communications and liaison between US and British security and intelligence organisations.

BSC used a number of legitimate outlets for its work. In 1940, a German agent, Gerhard Alois Westrick, who was cultivating support and possible sabotage among American oil companies, was effectively exposed through news articles placed in the New York Herald Tribune. A wave of public outrage was followed by Weldrick's expulsion from the US and the forced resignation of the head of Texaco (Torkild Rieber). Through third parties, BSC developed the independent and non-profit WRUL shortwave radio station foreign-language broadcast capability and then fed it stories it wanted disseminated worldwide. The station had a large number of listeners who corresponded with the station, which made it possible for reactions to the broadcasts to be directly monitored. For a period, the station was unwittingly the agent of BSC; after the US entered the war, the WRUL operation was turned over to US control.

Although the British and Americans were co-operating at the Prime Minister-President level at the time, the arrival of "British spies" in the United States infuriated J. Edgar Hoover, the director of the Federal Bureau of Investigation, and displeased the US Department of State.

Stephenson and Hoover did not see eye to eye but had cooperated in a number of operations against espionage activities by Nazi Germany in the US. The British hired Americans despite promising otherwise. The Americans who were recruited in the BSC were given British identification numbers beginning with the digits 4 and 8, apparently representing the 48 states.

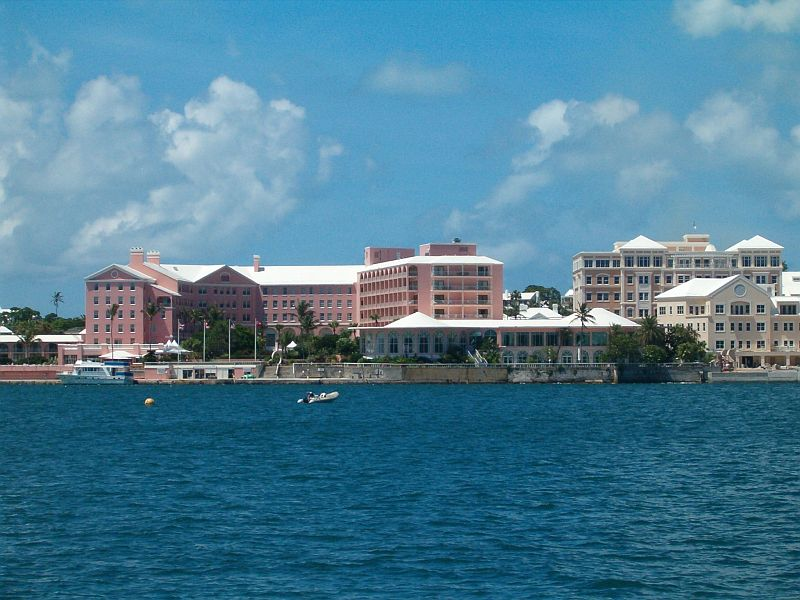
The Princess Hotel in Pembroke Bermuda

In 1939, Stephenson arranged for the Princess Hotel in the British colony of Bermuda to become a censorship centre (after initially operating at Prospect Camp. All mail, radio and telegraphic traffic bound for Europe, the U.S. and the Far East were intercepted and analyzed by 1,200 censors, of British Imperial Censorship, part of British Security Coordination (BSC), before being routed to their destination. With BSC working closely with the FBI, the censors were responsible for the discovery and arrest of a number of Axis spies operating in the US, including the Joe K ring.

It was through the BSC that the British acquired the powerful "Aspidistra" transmitter that was used for propaganda by the Political Warfare Executive (PWE), BBC overseas broadcasts and by the Royal Air Force (RAF) in the war against Germany. BSC also sourced a transmitter for it to communicate with the UK which was operated under the code name "Hydra" at Camp X, BSC's Special Training School No. 103, a Second World War paramilitary installation in Whitby, Ontario for training covert agents in the methods of "secret warfare". The Hydra station was established in May 1942 by engineer Benjamin deForest Bayly; he also invented a very fast coding/decoding machine for telegraph transmissions labelled the Rockex. Camp X had been established in December 1941 by Stephenson to train Allied agents in methods of clandestine operations; many graduates would be dropped behind enemy lines in Europe by SOE.

The British novelist William Boyd, in a 2006 article for The Guardian, stated that although the total number of BSC agents operating in the US in the early 1940s is unknown, he estimated there were at least "many hundreds" and had seen "the figure of up to 3,000 mentioned".

Noël Coward saw Stephenson, colloquially known as "Little Bill", at the end of July 1940 when on a world entertainment and propaganda tour. He wrote that the "suite in the Hampshire House with the outsize chintz flowers crawling over the walls became pleasantly familiar to me..." and that Stephenson "had a considerable influence on the next few years of my life". Stephenson offered him a job but was overruled by London.

== Counter-smuggling and "shipping security" ==
South America was an important neutral source of trade for the Axis forces; its importance would increase after the US entry into the war in 1941. The Italian airline LATI operated a transatlantic service - between Rome and Rio de Janeiro - which was a conduit for high-value goods (platinum, mica, diamonds, etc.), agents and diplomatic bags. London instructed the BSC to do something about that.

The airline had connections with the Brazilian government through the President's son-in-law, and it was supplied, despite the US State Department protests, by Standard Oil in the US, making official channels ineffective. To curtail LATI's activities, the BSC decided that the Brazilians themselves would have to take measures - sabotage would be only a temporary inconvenience. Accordingly, the BSC constructed a forged letter of such accuracy that its authenticity could not be questioned even under forensic examination. The letter purported to come from LATI's head office to an executive of the company stationed in Brazil. The contents included disparaging references to the Brazilian president and to the US, and implied connections with a fascist opposition party in Brazil, the Party of Popular Representation (founded in 1945). Following a "burglary" of the executive's house, a photostat of the letter was placed with an American Associated Press reporter, who immediately took it to the American Embassy, which then showed the letter to the President of Brazil, Getúlio Vargas. LATI's operations in Brazil were confiscated and its personnel interned - the airline ceased transatlantic flights in December 1941. Brazil broke off relations with the Axis and joined the Allies in 1942.

== Notable BSC employees ==
- Cedric Belfrage
- Roald Dahl – after he was transferred to Washington, D.C. as Assistant Air Attaché
- F. William D. Deakin – later first Warden of St. Antony's College, Oxford University
- Dick Ellis – deputy-head, post-war accused of being spy for the Germans and the Soviets
- Ian Fleming
- Alexander Halpern — Menshevik and ex-Freemason
- Gilbert Highet – classicist, later Professor of Latin Language and Literature at Columbia University
- A. J. Ayer – philosopher, later Wykeham Professor of Logic at Oxford University
- H. Montgomery Hyde – counter-espionage Intelligence Corps officer
- Dorothy Maclean
- Kenneth J. Maidment – classicist, later founding Vice-Chancellor of the University of Auckland
- Eric Maschwitz – screenwriter, lyricist and broadcaster, Intelligence Corps officer
- David Ogilvy – applied Gallup audience research techniques
- John Arthur Reid Pepper
- Ivan T. Sanderson
- Herbert Sichel
- Betty Thorpe – spy, codenamed "Cynthia"
- Harold Phillips

== See also ==
- Camp X
- British Information Services, the corresponding white propaganda operation
