= Herbert Sichel =

Herbert Sichel (1915–1995) was a statistician who made great advances in the areas of both theoretical and applied statistics.

He developed the Sichel-t estimator for the log-normal distribution's t-statistic. He also made great leaps in the area of the generalized inverse Gaussian distribution, the mixture of which with the Poisson distribution became known as the Sichel distribution.

Dr Sichel pioneered the science of geostatistics with Danie Krige in the early 1950s. Sichel also was well recognised in the field of statistical linguistics.

He established the Operational Research Bureau in 1952. He was appointed as professor in Statistics and Operations Research in the Graduate Business School of the University of the Witwatersrand. He has been recognized as "one of the grand old men of the SA Statistical Association". In 1958 he was elected as a Fellow of the American Statistical Association.

The Herbert Sichel medal was established in 1997 and is awarded annually to the best statistics paper published in a South African journal in the previous year.
