= Rockex =

Cipher machine

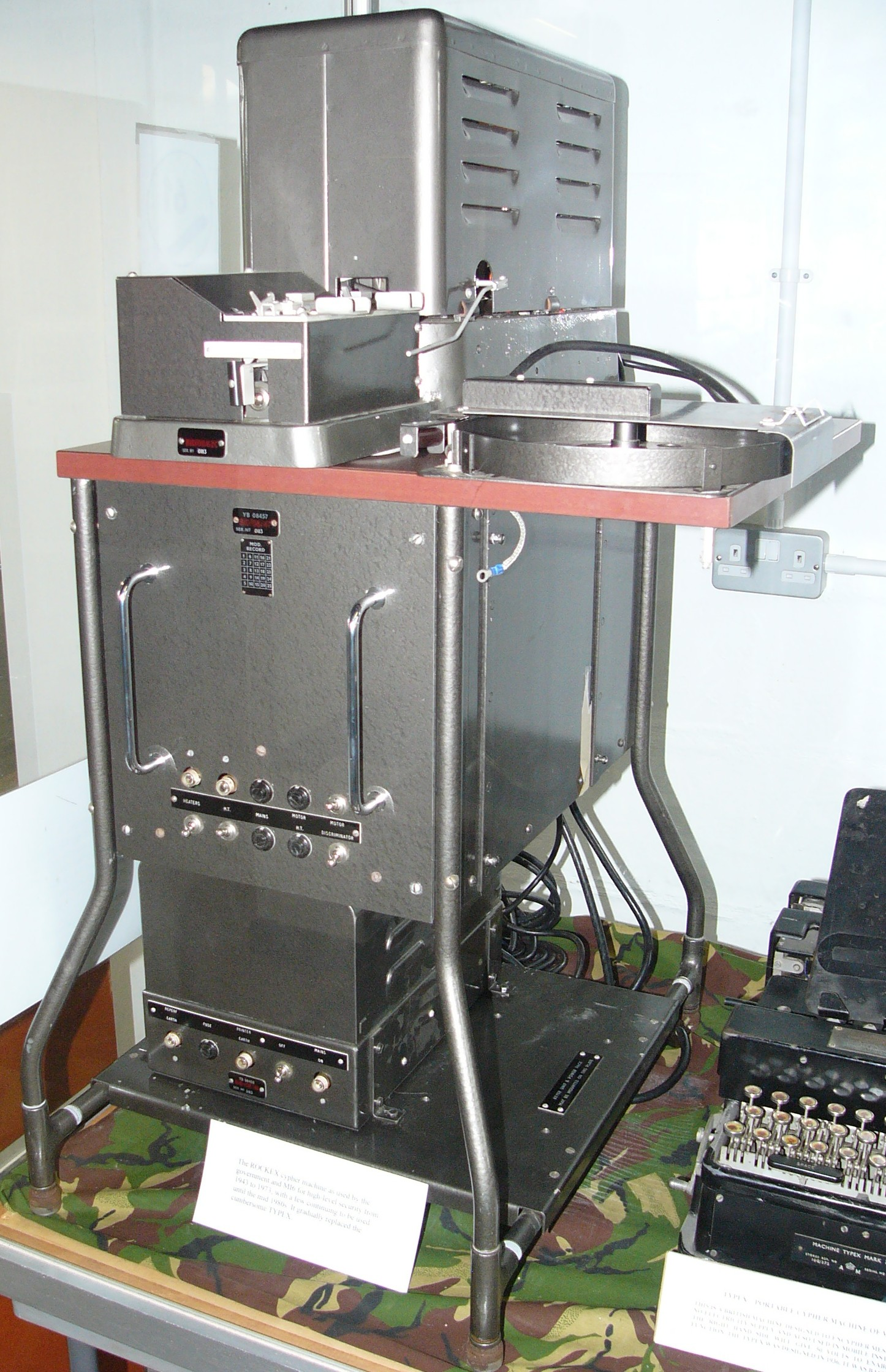
Rockex equipment

Rockex, or Telekrypton, was an offline one-time tape Vernam cipher machine known to have been used by Britain and Canada from 1943. It was developed by Canadian electrical engineer Benjamin deForest Bayly, working during the war for British Security Coordination.

"Rockex" was named after the Rockefeller Center, together with the tradition for naming British cipher equipment with the suffix "-ex" (e.g. Typex).

== Rockex II ==
Developing the prototype of the Rockex II was done in New York, with experimentation on the initial prototype occurring in England in June 1944. In production, making one time tape was managed by the War Office and monitored by the Government Code and Cypher School. Production of the machines was done by the Radio Security Service at Hanslope Park until 31 December 1946, under Brigadier Sir Richard Gambier-Parry.

== Post World War II ==
After World War II the Rockex machines and the code tapes were manufactured in great secrecy under the control of the Secret Intelligence Service (SIS), also known as MI6, at a small factory at Number 4 Chester Road, Borehamwood on the northern outskirts of London. To minimise the number of people who knew about the process, MI6's head of communications, Brigadier Sir Richard Gambier-Parry, took out a personal lease on the factory buildings and employed people through the local labour exchange as an entirely private venture ostensibly unconnected with government. The end product was then sold to the government departments who used the machines. This was not discovered by the UK Treasury until 1951 who were most concerned that no form of financial auditing had ever been exercised over the organisation. The Treasury officials were eventually convinced that the factory needed to be treated as a special case, and they allowed it to continue privately but with a special arrangement for top secret auditing (Natl Archives file T220/1444).

== Further models and usage ==
There were also a Mark III and Mark V. After the war it was used by British consulates and embassies until 1973, although a few continued in use until the mid-1980s.

== See also ==
- Noreen
