= Paul Borchardt =

German archaeologist

Paul Borchardt (23 July 1886 – 29 September 1957) was a German archaeologist, a pupil of the geographer Siegfried Passarge. He is known for his theory that the mythical city of Atlantis was located in Tunisia. Borchardt argued that the Shott el Jerid swamp, generally thought to mark the site of Lake Tritonis, was in fact the original Atlantic Sea referred to by Plato. Borchardt also identified Mount Atlas as being a peak in the Ahaggar Mountains, rather than in the Atlas range. He related the names of Berber tribes to the names of Poseidon's sons in Greek mythology, and suggested links between the city of Atlantis, the palace of Alkinoös referenced in The Odyssey and the City of Brass in the tales of The Arabian Nights. He believed he had discovered Atlantean ruins at Qabes, but these ruins were later found to be of Roman origin.

In the fall of 1938, Borchardt was incarcerated at Dachau, due to his Jewish ancestry. He was later released after a friend intervened on his behalf. Borchardt went to Britain in 1939, and thence to the United States. He was arrested and put on trial for spying in 1941, and was sentenced to 20 years imprisonment. His early release was secured in 1952 due to petitioning from the German government. Borchardt died in Bavaria in 1957.
