= Akbar Ahmed =

Pakistani-American academic and former diplomat

- اکبر صلاح الدین احمد
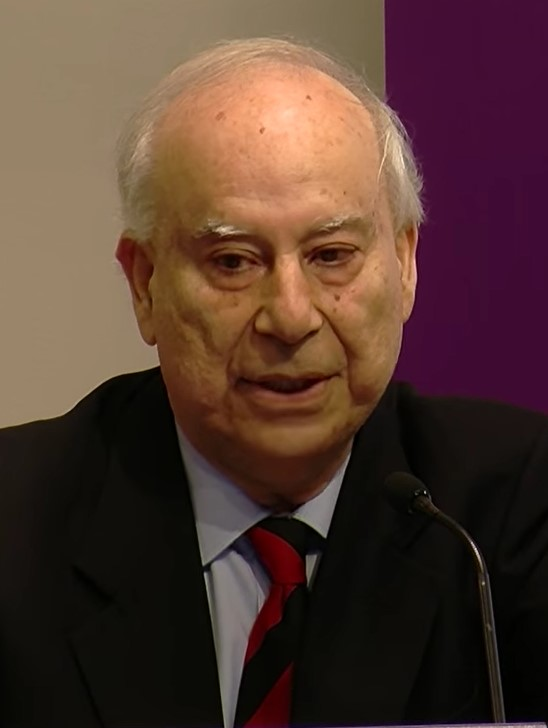
- Ahmed in 2016
- Born: January 15, 1943 (age 83); Allahabad, British India
- Education: Army Burn Hall College, University of Cambridge, School of Oriental and African Studies, University of London
- Occupation: Scholar
- Website: Official website

Akbar Salahuddin Ahmed (born 15 January 1943) is a Pakistani-American academic, author, poet, playwright, filmmaker and former diplomat. He currently is a professor of International Relations and holds the Ibn Khaldun Chair of Islamic Studies at the American University, School of International Service in Washington, D.C. Akbar Ahmed served as the Pakistan High Commissioner to the UK and Ireland. He currently is a Global Fellow at the Woodrow Wilson Center.

Immediately prior, he taught at Princeton University and served as a visiting professor at the Institute for Advanced Study in Princeton. He also taught at Harvard University and was a visiting scholar at the Department of Anthropology. Ahmed was the First Chair of Middle East and Islamic Studies at the US Naval Academy, Annapolis, and a Nonresident Senior Fellow at the Brookings Institution. In 2004 Ahmed was named District of Columbia Professor of the Year by the Carnegie Foundation for the Advancement of Teaching and the Council for Advancement and Support of Education. A former Pakistani High Commissioner to the UK and Ireland, Ahmed was a member of the Civil Service of Pakistan and served as Political Agent in South Waziristan Agency and Commissioner in Balochistan. He also served as the Iqbal Fellow (Chair of Pakistan Studies) at the University of Cambridge. An anthropologist and scholar of Islam, he completed his MA at Cambridge University and received his PhD from the School of Oriental and African Studies in London. He has been called "the world's leading authority on contemporary Islam" by the BBC.

Ahmed received the Tamgha-i-Imtiaz (Medal of Excellence) and Sitara-i-Imtiaz (Star of Excellence) from the Pakistani government for academic distinction and the Sir Percy Sykes Memorial Medal by the Royal Society for Asian Affairs in London. He was also awarded the inaugural Purpose Prize in 2006 alongside Judea Pearl and is frequently named in the annual book, The Muslim 500: The World's 500 Most Influential Muslims, and was named a 2015 Global Thought Leader by The World Post and the Gottlieb Duttweiler Institute.

== Career ==
=== Living Islam ===
Hugh Purcell, the executive producer of the BBC television series Living Islam (1993), who worked closely with Ahmed on the production, wrote in a 2025 review that Ahmed’s work over the decades reflects a sustained commitment to peace and “co-existence,” calling it “sorely needed.” Purcell, a BBC producer with over two decades of experience, has also stated that Living Islam, presented by Ahmed, was the production he was “most proud of” in his career.

=== Civil service and academia ===
He studied at Burn Hall School (now Army Burn Hall College) in Abbottabad from 1954 to 1959. Burn Hall was founded in 1943 by members of Saint Joseph's Missionary Society of Mill Hill (MHM) in British India as a missionary school for boys. It was ceded to Pakistan Army Education Corps in 1977 and was renamed Army Burn Hall College. Ahmed entered the Pakistani civil service in 1966. He graduated from University of the Punjab and University of Birmingham and later attended Cambridge University doing an MA. In 1978, Ahmed graduated with a PhD in Anthropology at the School of Oriental and African Studies, University of London. At certain points in his life Ahmed held important government positions such as Political Agent for the South Waziristan Agency/North West Frontier Province (1978-1980) and in Baluchistan was Commissioner for the three districts (1982-1988) and Commissioner of the Sibi Division (1989). Ahmed was the founder and served as Director of the National Centre for Rural Development in Islamabad and also a Director of the Centre for Social Sciences and Humanities, University Grants Commission in Pakistan. In 1988 Ahmed became the Allama Iqbal Fellow at Selywn College, Cambridge for five years and by 1993 he was appointed as the first Muslim Fellow. He also was the first Pakistani to serve on the Council of the Royal Anthropological Institute of Great Britain and Ireland.

Akbar Ahmed has held professorships at several North American educational institutions. At Princeton University he taught courses and served as a visiting professor at the Institute for Advanced Study in Princeton. He also taught at Harvard University and was a visiting scholar at the Department of Anthropology. Ahmed was the First Chair of Middle East and Islamic Studies at the US Naval Academy, Annapolis, and a Nonresident Senior Fellow at the Brookings Institution. In 2004 Ahmed was named District of Columbia Professor of the Year by the Carnegie Foundation for the Advancement of Teaching and the Council for Advancement and Support of Education. He also taught at the Quaid-i-Azam University in Pakistan.

Prior to the Brookings quartet of studies, Ahmed's projects included the Jinnah Quartet and Living Islam. The Jinnah Quartet comprised a feature film Jinnah (1998), with Christopher Lee in the title role; a documentary, Mr. Jinnah: The Making of Pakistan (1997); a graphic novel, The Quaid: Jinnah and the Story of Pakistan (1997); and a biographical study, Jinnah, Pakistan and Islamic Identity: The Search for Saladin (1997). Ahmed presented and narrated the six-part BBC TV series Living Islam (1993) and authored the accompanying book of the same name. Later, Ahmed served as Pakistani High Commissioner (ambassador) to the United Kingdom and Ireland from 1999 to 2000.

=== Research interests and literary works ===
Ahmed's research interests focus on Pashtuns and others including tribal groups, Muslim society and development anthropology. He has conducted anthropological fieldwork with Pashtuns in Afghanistan, undertaken comparative studies of Islamic social customs in Morocco, Pakistan and Saudi Arabia and researching global Islam alongside its impacts on contemporary society. Among his works on Pashtuns are: Millennium and Charisma Among Pathans (1976), Pukhtun Economy and Society (1980), and his wide-ranging study The Thistle and the Drone (2013) that focuses on Muslim hill peoples in Pakistan, Yemen, North Africa and afar as the Philippines which examines US drone operations in the Muslim world, its subsequent consequences and reputation of the USA being considered synonymous with the drone. Ahmed has criticized some anthropologists for studying "Muslim groups without reference to the Islamic framework". Other areas of research interest include Modernity and Muslims along with Islam and the concept of postmodernism in relation to Muslim societies, cultures, media and the West.

Ahmed has co-edited several books with other academics. He has authored many articles and more than a dozen books that have won awards such as Discovering Islam which became the basis for a six-part BBC TV series called Living Islam. Other books are Postmodernism and Islam: Predicament and Promise which was nominated for an Amalfi Award and Islam Today: A short Introduction to the Muslim world was awarded by the Los Angeles Times as the best non-fiction book of the year. Ahmed has written a biography of Muhammad Jinnah, Pakistan's first Governor General. and a study Journey into America: The challenge of Islam based on fieldwork with American Muslims. He has also written plays like Noor and The trial of Dara Shikoh which have been published and staged for audiences. Ahmed's publications have been translated into other languages such as Indonesian and Chinese. Functioning between both worlds, through his writing and broadcasting Ahmed has attempted to bridge the Muslim-West world divide and encourage communication between both groups. He has expressed admiration of English translations of Islamic classics in assisting him to "discover the riches" of "Islamic cultural legacy" and "appreciate critically the beneficial impact of the West".

=== Interfaith dialogue ===
In the aftermath of 9/11, Ahmed initiated a series of studies that were published by the Brookings Institution Press covering issues regarding relations between Islam and the West. Ahmed has been engaged in a series of public interfaith dialogues across the US and abroad with Professor Judea Pearl, father of deceased reporter Daniel Pearl focusing on divisions between Muslims and the West and between Jews and Muslims. For their efforts, he and Pearl were awarded the first Purpose Prize by the Interfaith Conference of Metropolitan Washington at the National Cathedral and Ahmed received the Herschel-King award for Interfaith Activism. He has also been appointed as a Trustee of the World Faiths Development Dialogue by the Archbishop of Canterbury and has received the 2002 Free Speech Award from the Muslim Public Affairs Council based in Washington DC. Ahmed has received accusations of being "a Zionist conspirator" and close to the West however he has felt that "dialogue, harmony, communication and debate" are for Islam and the West the key issues of engagement.

=== Media appearances and advisory roles ===
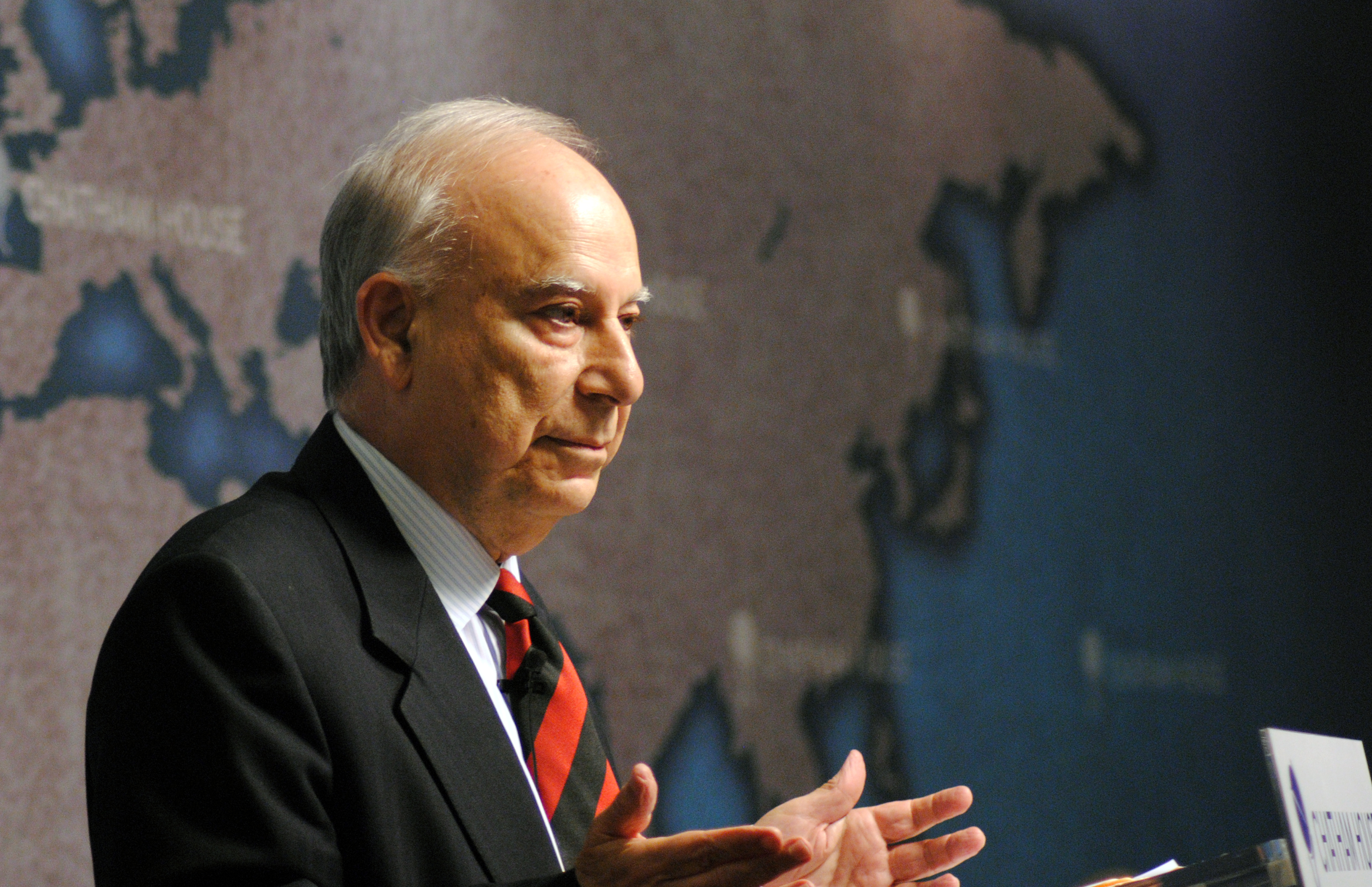
Akbar Ahmed giving a speech at Chatham House, 2013

Ahmed has been interviewed by the BBC, PBS, NPR, MSNBC, "Think Tank," NBC Nightly News, CNN, CBS, Fox News, and other media organisations. In addition to The Daily Show and The O'Reilly Factor, he has made several appearances on the Oprah Winfrey Show.

He has also served as an advisor to President George W. Bush and Prince Charles on Islam. Ahmed has given lectures worldwide in places such as the US Congressional retreat in Greenbrier, West Virginia, the National Defense University in Washington DC, the State Department and the House of Lords in London.

== Books ==
- The Flying Man, Aristotle, and the Philosophers of the Golden Age of Islam: Their Relevance Today (2021).
- Journey into Europe: Islam, Immigration, and Identity (Brookings Press, 2018).
- The Thistle and the Drone: How America's War on Terror Became a Global War on Tribal Islam (Brookings Press, 2013).
- Suspended Somewhere Between: A Book of Verse (Busboys and Poets, 2011).
- Journey into America: The Challenge of Islam (Brookings Press, 2010; Winner of the American Book Award).
- Journey into Islam: The Crisis of Globalization (Brookings Press, 2007).
- After Terror: Promoting Dialogue Among Civilizations Co-Edited by Brian Forst, (Polity Press, 2005).
- Islam Under Siege: Living Dangerously in a Post-Honor World (Polity Press, 2003).
- The Future of Anthropology: Its Relevance to the Contemporary World; Co-Edited by Chris Shore, (Athlone Press, 1999).
- Islam Today: A Short Introduction to The Muslim World; (I.B. Tauris, 1998).
- Jinnah, Pakistan and Islamic Identity: The Search for Saladin; (Routledge, 1997).
- Islam, Globalization and Postmodernity with Hastings Donnan; (Routledge, 1994).
- Living Islam: From Samarkand and Stornoway (BBC Books, 1993).
- Discovering Islam: Making Sense of Muslim History and Society; (Routledge, 1988).
- Postmodernism and Islam: Predicament and Promise; (Routledge, 1992).
- Resistance and Control in Pakistan; (Routledge, 1991).
- Pakistan: The Social Sciences' Perspective; (Oxford University Press, 1990).
- Toward Islamic Anthropology: Definition, Dogma, and Directions; (Vanguard Books, 1987).
- Religion and Politics in Muslim Society: Order and Conflict in Pakistan; (Royal Book Co., 1987).
- Pukhtun Economy and Society: Traditional Structure and Economic Development in a Tribal Society (Routledge, 1980).
- Pieces of Green, the Sociology of Change in Pakistan, 1964–1974; (Royal Book Co., 1977).
- Social and Economic change in the Tribal Areas, 1972–1976; (Oxford University Press, 1977).
- Millennium and Charisma Among Pathans: A Critical Essay in Social Anthropology (Routledge, 1976)
- Mataloona: Pukhto Proverbs (Oxford University Press, 1975).
- Mansehra: A Journey (Ferozsons, 1973).

== Plays ==
- The Trial of Dara Shikoh (Saqi Books, 2009)
- Noor (Saqi Books, 2009)

== Films ==
- Journey into Europe (Documentary, 2015)
- Journey into America (Documentary, 2009)
- Jinnah (Feature Film, 1998)
- Mr. Jinnah: The Making of Pakistan (Documentary, 1997)
- Living Islam (BBC Six-Part Series, 1993)

== See also ==
- Contemporary Islamic philosophy
- Anthropology
- International Relations
- Islamic studies
