= Charles Allen (writer) =

British freelance writer (1940–2020)

- Born: 2 January 1940; Cawnpore, United Provinces, British India (now Kanpur, Uttar Pradesh, India)
- Died: 16 August 2020 (aged 80); London, England, United Kingdom
- Occupations: Writer and historian

Charles Robin Allen (2 January 1940 – 16 August 2020) was a British writer, popular historian and broadcaster who specialised in the history of British Raj and South Asian archaeology. He first gained wide recognition with his 1975 bestselling book Plain Tales from the Raj.

He went on to author 25 books. His later works include A Mountain in Tibet (1982), Soldier Sahibs (2000), The Buddha and the Sahibs (2002), Duel in the Snows (2004), God's Terrorists (2006), Kipling Sahib (2007), Ashoka: The Search for India's Lost Emperor (2012), Coromandel (2017), and the posthumously published Aryans (2023). In 2004, he was awarded the Percy Sykes Memorial Medal by the Royal Society for Asian Affairs.

== Early life ==
Charles Robin Allen was born in Cawnpore (present-day Kanpur, Uttar Pradesh, India). His father,Geoffrey Allen, was a political officer on the North East Frontier. Six generations of his family served under the British Raj, dating back to the Siege of Seringapatam in 1799. His great-grandfather Sir George Allen owned the Civil and Military Gazette in Lahore and The Pioneer in Allahabad which gave Rudyard Kipling his first journalism job in 1882. Brigadier-General John Nicholson was a collateral relative.

When Allen was four years old, his father was appointed Assistant Political Officer on the Balipara Frontier Tract in Assam, India. He spend his early childhood there. After India became independent, the Allen family returned to England in 1948. Allen left Canford school with no qualifications at age 17. He then worked as an apprentice tea-taster in the City of London for next two years. He then travelled to Perugia, Italy, and got his only formal post-secondary education at Università per Stranieri where he studied for 18 months on an Italian government scholarship and qualified as a teacher.

== Career ==
Between 1966 and 1967 Allen moved to Nepal to work with Voluntary Service Overseas. In Nepal Allen developed a fascination with Buddhism and as time passed he began to see himself as “Buddhist”. In Kathmandu he met his future wife, Liz Gould, whom he married in 1972. Allen supported the rights of low-caste Dalits, opposing the injustices that he had seen when growing up in India. It was at this time that he became convinced that he had a future as a travel writer. Following his work with Voluntary Service Overseas, Allen embarked on a Himalayan Trek which won him the Sunday Telegraph Traveler of the year trophy in 1967.

Success as a writer, came in 1974 via his involvement with the BBC Radio 4 oral history series and subsequent book Plain Tales from the Raj. As Allen stated in the preface to the book, "It was my good luck to attend Michael Mason, as chela to his guru, serving my apprenticeship as an oral historian by being sent out with a bulky tape-recorder to interview 'survivors' of the British Raj in their homes." In December 1975, Allen was travelling in India when he received news that the book had reached the best seller list in the UK, vying with Edward Heath's new book Sailing. Subsequently, Allen spent long periods of his adult life in India as a traveller and writer of history. Allen also trekked and climbed extensively in the Himalayas, arctic Norway, the jungles of Sarawak and in 1979 was among the first foreigners for many years to reach "Cow Mouth" which is the traditional source of the Ganges River which lies at 3,962m (13,000 feet) above sea level, in the Gangotri glacier. The river emanates from a cavern called Gaumukh, meaning 'Cow's Mouth', because of its shape. Allen's work focuses largely on India and the Indian subcontinent in general. Allen was criticised for not acknowledging the subcontinent's natural and political history during the British rule by Edward Said in his book Orientalism. Allen countered in 2015 that “We use that word history — we bandy it about too seriously. History is a minefield. It has always been used as propaganda. We have to look at it with an open mind.”

Allen died at his home in London, England on 16 August 2020 aged 80. He is survived by his children and his wife, Elizabeth. Allen was awarded the Sir Percy Sykes gold medal in 2004, by the Royal Society for Asian Affairs for his services to south Asian history. At the time of his death he had just completed Aryans, a book, which tells the story of ancient Aryan migration to India. The book was published in 2023. He was an active Fellow of the Royal Geographical Society and the Royal Asiatic Society, a Council Member of the Kipling Society and a Member of the Royal Society for Asian Affairs and the Frontline Club.

Among his works are Kipling Sahib: India and the making of Rudyard Kipling, a biography of Rudyard Kipling.

== Reception and Criticism ==
His books were widely praised in the British and Indian press for their narrative energy and synthesis of archival and archaeological material. William Dalrymple in The Guardian called Allen "one of the most underrated and consistently enjoyable writers of his generation", while Tabish Khair in The Independent praised Kipling Sahib for capturing the contradictions of Kipling's relationship with India, and John Keay in Literary Review commended his efforts to rehabilitate overlooked colonial scholar-administrators.

Critics have argued that Allen's works downplayed colonial exploitation while framing British rule as a benevolent civilising mission. Publishers Weekly faulted Soldier Sahibs for its "unapologetically imperialist perspective", and Kirkus Reviews noted that Allen was "uncritical in his admiration for British arms". In a 2021 essay in Swarajya, economist Sanjeev Sanyal accused Allen of "covert racism", citing passages in Plain Tales from the Raj that praised "benevolent paternalism" and "the 'great civilizing effect' of the Indian Army" while omitting colonial famines. Renuka Narayanan in the Hindustan Times criticised Kipling Sahib for glossing over Kipling's imperialist racism and reducing Indians to background figures.

Reviewing The Prisoner of Kathmandu in Studies in Nepali History and Society, anthropologist Mark Liechty wrote that Allen presented Brian Hodgson "without even a whiff of critical consciousness as to the colonial sociology of knowledge" and was "out of his depth" in his "gratuitous pot-shots at Edward Said's Orientalism, in which Allen mistakes Said's broad critique of imperialist knowledge production for personal attacks on his beloved Orientalists." Both Liechty and historian Douglas F. Ober in HIMALAYA criticised the book's lack of in-text citations, incomplete footnotes, and omission of a bibliography and index. Similarly, reviewing God's Terrorists in The Independent, Marianne Brace noted that Allen's inability to read primary sources in Arabic, Persian, or Urdu made his reliance on British accounts "perhaps one-sided", while Samanth Subramanian in The Guardian noted that Ashoka recycled large sections of Allen's earlier Buddhism books.

Several reviewers objected to factual and geographical errors in Allen's later books. Sanyal and Narayanan condemned Allen's assertion in Coromandel that "India was never a seafaring nation" as a negation of millennia of Indian maritime trade with Mesopotamia, Rome, and Southeast Asia, as well as his claim that northern India had comparatively few Mother Goddess (Shakti) shrines. Outlook India flagged multiple geographical and factual errors in Coromandel (such as placing Andhra Pradesh's Srikakulam in Odisha and misstating scholar M. M. Kalburgi's background), while Peter Gordon in the Asian Review of Books noted "eyebrow-raising" claims in Aryans, such as doubting the local manufacture of the Harappan bronze Dancing Girl.

== Works ==
=== Books ===
- 1975. Plain Tales from the Raj: Images of British India in the Twentieth Century.
- 1977. RAJ: A Scrapbook of British India 1877-1947. ISBN 978-0-312-66307-0
- 1979. Tales from the Dark Continent: Images of British Colonial Africa in the Twentieth Century.
- 1982. A Mountain in Tibet: The Search for Mount Kailas and the Sources of the Great Rivers of Asia. ISBN 978-0-349-13938-8
- 1983. Tales from the South China Seas: Images of the British in South-East Asia in the Twentieth Century.
- 1984. Lives of the Indian Princes, with co-author Sharada Dwivedi.
- 1987. Kipling's Kingdom: His Best Indian Stories.
- 1986. A Glimpse of the Burning Plain: Leaves from the Journals of Charlotte Canning.
- 1988. A Soldier of the Company: Life of an Indian Ensign 1833-43. ISBN 978-0-7181-3121-0
- 1989. Architecture of the British Empire, Ed. R. Fermor-Hesketh.
- 1990. The Savage Wars of Peace: Soldiers' Voices 1945-1989. ISBN 978-0-7181-2882-1
- 1991. Thunder and Lightning: the RAF in the Gulf War.
- 1999. The Search for Shangri-La: a Journey into Tibetan History.
- 2000. India Through the Lens: Photography 1840-1911, Ed. Vidya Dehejia.
- 2000. Soldier Sahibs: the Men who Made the North-West Frontier. ISBN 978-0-7867-0861-1.
- 2002. The Buddha and the Sahibs: the Men who Discovered India's Lost Religion.
- 2004. Duel in the Snows: the True Story of the Younghusband Mission to Lhasa.
- 2005. Maharajas: Resonance from the Past.
- 2006. God's Terrorists: the Wahhabi Cult and the Hidden Roots of Modern Jihad.
- 2007. Kipling Sahib: India and the Making of Rudyard Kipling.ISBN 978-0-349-11685-3.
- 2008. The Buddha and Dr Fuhrer: an Archaeological Scandal. ISBN 978-0-14-341574-9.
- 2011. The Taj at Apollo Bunder: the History of the Taj Mahal Palace, Mumbai, with co-author Sharada Dwivedi.
- 2012. Ashoka: the Search for India's Lost Emperor. ISBN 978-1-4683-0071-0.
- 2015. The Prisoner of Kathmandu: Brian Hodgson in Nepal 1820-43. ISBN 978-1-910376-11-9.
- 2017. Coromandel: a personal history of South India. ISBN 978-1-4087-0539-1.
- 2017. Introduction to Rudyard Kipling, The Eyes of Asia.
- 2023. Aryans: The Search for a People, a Place and a Myth. ISBN 9789357312684.

=== Film ===
- 2013. Bones of the Buddha (host).
