= Jesse Fink =

British-Australian author

- Born: 1973 (age 52–53); London, United Kingdom
- Occupation: Author
- Writing career
- Period: 2007–present
- Genre: Nonfiction
- Website: www.jessefinkbooks.com

Jesse Fink (born 1973) is a British-Australian author of seven books including twin biographies of the hard-rock band AC/DC (The Youngs: The Brothers Who Built AC/DC and Bon: The Last Highway), the cocaine-trafficking story Pure Narco, The Eagle in the Mirror, a biography of British intelligence officer Dick Ellis, and The Drinker's Guide to Japan. His books have been translated into several languages, including Spanish, Italian, Portuguese, Japanese, German and French.

== Biography ==
Born in London, United Kingdom, Fink was educated at schools in Sydney, Australia. He attended the University of Technology, majoring in journalism.

=== Early career ===
Fink began his writing career in sports journalism, working as an editor of sports and nonfiction titles for the Australian arm of book publisher HarperCollins and later as a deputy editor of Inside Sport. In 2003, he was nominated for a Walkley Award for a feature about the sports memorabilia industry. It was included in the Black Inc. anthology The Best Australian Sportswriting 2004, as was "Safari Politics", a feature on trophy hunting. Another Inside Sport feature, "Silent Witness", about mental illness among high-performance athletes, won an Australian Sports Commission Media Award.

Fink left Inside Sport magazine to work as a soccer writer for Fox Sports Australia in 2006. In 2007, under the moniker Half-Time Orange, he began writing soccer columns for SBS Television's The World Game website as well as columns for ESPN Star Sports (later Fox Sports Asia) in Singapore, Tribal Football and The Roar.

In 2011 departed SBS after an editorial disagreement with late network anchor Les Murray over what he alleged was interference from Murray in his critical reporting of Australia's 2022 FIFA World Cup bid and general commentary on Football Federation Australia. Fink appeared on ABC Television's 7.30 to give his side of the story and in a number of online editorials, including Qatari network Al Jazeera, accused then-FIFA Ethics Committee member Murray of conflict of interest in his SBS position.

=== Books ===
==== 15 Days in June (2007) ====
In 2007 Fink published his first book, 15 Days in June, the story of the Socceroos at the 2006 FIFA World Cup. It was re-released by Xoum Publishing in a special e-book edition before the 2014 FIFA World Cup under the new title World Party. Socceroos star Tim Cahill wrote the foreword. In 2021, the book was chosen for the Untapped project and digital and print editions under the original title were released by Ligature.

==== Laid Bare (2012) ====
In 2012 Fink published his second book, Laid Bare: One Man’s Story of Sex, Love and Other Disorders (Hachette Australia), a memoir of divorce and dating. It was re-published in 2017 by Xoum Publishing (which changed its name to Brio Books in 2018). His writing on relationships regularly appeared in News Limited's Sunday Style magazine.

==== The Youngs: The Brothers Who Built AC/DC (2013) ====
His third book, The Youngs: The Brothers Who Built AC/DC, a ‘critical appreciation’ of Angus Young, George Young and Malcolm Young, was named one of Public Radio International's The World Books of the Year in 2014. The New Yorker called it "an essential read for fans of the band".

==== Bon: The Last Highway (2017) ====
Fink's fourth book, Bon: The Last Highway, was a biography of deceased AC/DC singer Bon Scott. Bon was the cover story in the December 2017 issue of Classic Rock. In the book, Fink concludes that Scott died of a mix of alcohol and heroin and not the official cause, acute alcohol poisoning. The book disputes the story that Scott was alone with London musician and alleged drug dealer Alistair Kinnear when he died and produces evidence that at least two other people were with Scott and Kinnear.

Fink also addresses and provides new information regarding the widespread speculation that Scott contributed uncredited lyrics to the AC/DC album Back in Black. Fink later responded to comments made by AC/DC singer Brian Johnson in Rolling Stone magazine about the lyrics issue. It was the first time Johnson had publicly addressed Fink's claims that Scott was an uncredited contributor of lyrics to the Back in Black album. After Johnson gave an interview to Metal Edge magazine again addressing the issue, Fink wrote a second response to Johnson.

In November 2022, the Bon Scott Estate issued a statement on its website to say the estate had never received 'any songwriting royalties for any songs’ on Back in Black, though this was contradicted in 2006 by the late Vince Lovegrove, former bandmate of Scott in The Valentines, who reported the estate received 'a small share of royalties from Back in Black, which comes in the form of half-yearly payments' and wrote of Scott's 'uncredited but royalty-paid contribution to the monumental Back in Black album'. Lovegrove also wrote on his personal website in 2011 before his death in 2012 that Scott's brother Derek Scott 'told me that the family has always received Scott's songwriting royalties for the album'.

Updated editions of Fink's book were released in Australia, the United Kingdom and the United States.

In 2024, on the 50th anniversary of Bon Scott joining AC/DC, Fink released Bon: Notes from the Highway, a follow-up to Bon: The Last Highway.

Fink was the first journalist to identify the long-unknown woman who inspired the AC/DC song 'Whole Lotta Rosie' as Rosemaree (Rose-Maree) Garcia and released the first photograph of Garcia.

Bon: The Last Highway was published in Italian in 2025 and Croatian in 2026.

==== Pure Narco (2020) ====
In 2020 Penguin Books Australia announced it was releasing his fifth book, Pure Narco, the life story of cocaine trafficker Luis Navia and the 12-nation law-enforcement operation that brought him down. It was published in the United Kingdom by John Blake and the United States by Rowman & Littlefield.

==== The Eagle in the Mirror (2023) ====
Fink's sixth book was a biography of Australian-born British intelligence officer Charles Howard "Dick" Ellis called The Eagle in the Mirror. The book was released in Australia and the United Kingdom in August 2023 and included in Publishers Weekly's Spring 2024 longlist for history. It was published by Citadel in the United States in May 2024 and chosen for BookBub's The Best Nonfiction of Spring 2024.

==== The Drinker's Guide to Japan (2026) ====
In 2026 Penguin Random House UK announced it was publishing Fink's seventh book, The Drinker's Guide to Japan, co-written with Wayne Shennen.

== Personal life ==
Fink has one daughter and is married.

== Bibliography ==
- 15 Days in June (Hardie Grant Books, 2007; revised edition Xoum Publishing, 2014; digital edition Ligature, 2021; new edition Ligature, 2022)
- Laid Bare (Hachette Australia, 2012; revised edition Xoum Publishing, 2017)
- The Youngs (St Martin's Press, Random House Australia, Black & White Publishing, Editorial Planeta Argentina, Disk Union, Hannibal Verlag, AST, People's Press, Giunti Editore, Volvox Globator, Camion Blanc, Editora Gutenberg, Versus Aureus, HarperCollins India, Dereta, Libros Cupula, 2013)
- Bon: The Last Highway (ECW Press, Penguin Books Australia, Black & White Publishing, Hannibal Verlag, Editora Saraiva, Disk Union, Le Castor Astral, Vaktel Forlag, 2017; revised edition Penguin Books Australia and Black & White Publishing, 2018; revised edition ECW Press, 2022; Il Castello Editore, 2025; Rockmark, 2026)
- Pure Narco (Penguin Books Australia and John Blake Publishing, 2020; Rowman & Littlefield, 2021; Äripäev, 2022)
- The Eagle in the Mirror (Penguin Books Australia and Black & White Publishing, 2023; Kensington Publishing, 2024)
- The Drinker's Guide to Japan (Penguin Random House UK, 2026)
