= Dick Ellis =

British and Australian intelligence officer

Dick Ellis CMG CBE TD
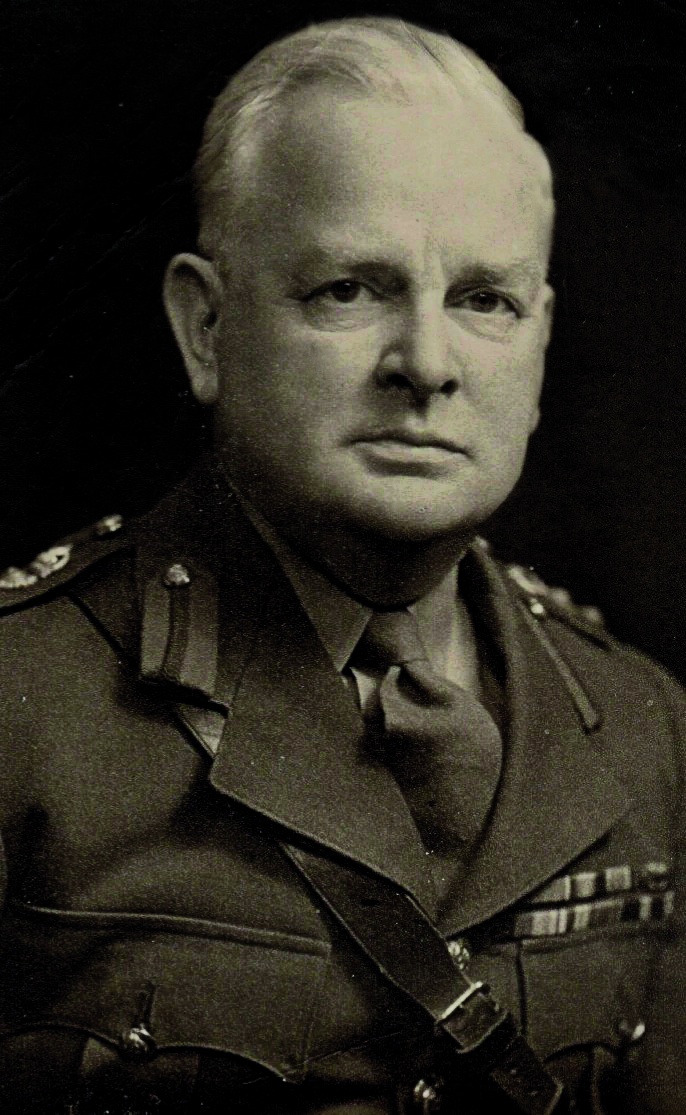
- Charles Howard 'Dick' Ellis
- Born: Charles Howard Ellis; 13 February 1895; Sydney, Australia
- Died: 5 July 1975 (aged 80); Eastbourne, East Sussex, England
- Education: St Edmund Hall, Oxford
- Occupation: Intelligence officer
- Children: Ann Salwey, Olik Ellis
- Awards: Officer of the Most Excellent Order of the British Empire, Commander of the Most Excellent Order of the British Empire, Legion of Merit, Companion of the Most Distinguished Order of St Michael and St George, Territorial Decoration, Commemorative Medal of the Battles of the Somme, Sir Percy Sykes Memorial Medal
- Espionage activity
- Agency: Secret Intelligence Service
- Rank: Colonel

Colonel Charles Howard "Dick" Ellis CMG CBE TD (13 February 1895 – 5 July 1975) was an Australian-born British intelligence officer credited with writing the blueprint for United States wartime intelligence agencies Coordinator of Information and Office of Strategic Services, what would become the CIA. For his contribution to the United States in World War II, he received the Legion of Merit from President Harry S. Truman.

Colonel David K. E. Bruce said that "without [Ellis's] assistance... American intelligence could not have gotten off the ground in World War II".

After his death, Ellis was alleged to have been a spy or 'triple agent' for Germany and the Soviet Union. According to British author Nigel West, a joint Security Service (MI5) and Secret Intelligence Service (SIS or MI6) internal group called the Fluency Committee believed that Ellis had been a spy for Nazi Germany's military-intelligence unit, the Abwehr, prior to World War II.

During interrogation by the Fluency Committee in the 1960s Ellis had, in the words of West, allegedly "made a limited confession, admitting his links to the Germans and claiming to have been kept impossibly short of money, but denying that he had ever succumbed to pressure from the Soviets, although he acknowledged it was likely they had learned of his treachery".

In the 1980s, Ellis was publicly accused first by British author Chapman Pincher and then by former MI5 officer and Fluency Committee member Peter Wright of being a traitor. Prime Minister Margaret Thatcher's refusal to confirm or deny Pincher's allegation caused distress to the Ellis family and his daughter, Ann Salwey, returned her father's medals to the British Government in protest.

British historian Donald Cameron Watt was among many vocal supporters of Ellis. Watt rubbished Wright's 1987 bestseller Spycatcher and the case against Ellis in a 1988 essay for The Political Quarterly:

The best that can be said of it is that, if no German evidence were available, if every piece of oral evidence recollected at distances of 30 years from the event was assumed to be unquestionably reliable, then this is the kind of reconstruction that an ignorant, simplificatory but conspiratorially inclined mind might advance as though it were reality. Ellis may have fed his White Russian contacts in Paris with information of a kind in the hope of using them both as a means of finding out what the Abwehr were interested in, and of creating a degree of confidence which could then be turned to advantage. It is equally possible, given the well-known paucity of resources put at MI6's disposal in the 1930s, that he attempted to better his situation by some kind of illegal financial dealings (as some believe). But the identifications, such as they are, to which Wright appeals, are worthless; and the rest is contrary to the historical evidence of the Abwehr's knowledge of, and activities against, MI6.

A former colleague of Ellis, Australian businessman and British Security Co-ordination secret agent Bill Ross-Smith, called the allegations against Ellis a "travesty of the truth... an unwarranted attack impugning the honour and integrity of a defenceless dead man".

== Early life in Australia ==
Ellis was born in Annandale, Sydney, Australia, to Devonshire-born William Edward Ellis and New Zealand-born Lillian Mary Hobday and spent most his early life in Sydney, Brisbane, Melbourne, Launceston and Warragul in Gippsland.

A largely self-educated student and self-trained classical musician, he played as a cellist in orchestras in Melbourne and won a scholarship after taking night classes at the University of Melbourne, which gave Ellis 'the possibility of taking a course at one of the English universities, provided a small sum of money could be found to cover the cost of the journey and sojourn in England'. In June 1914, he travelled to England.

== Military service in World War I and Central Asia ==
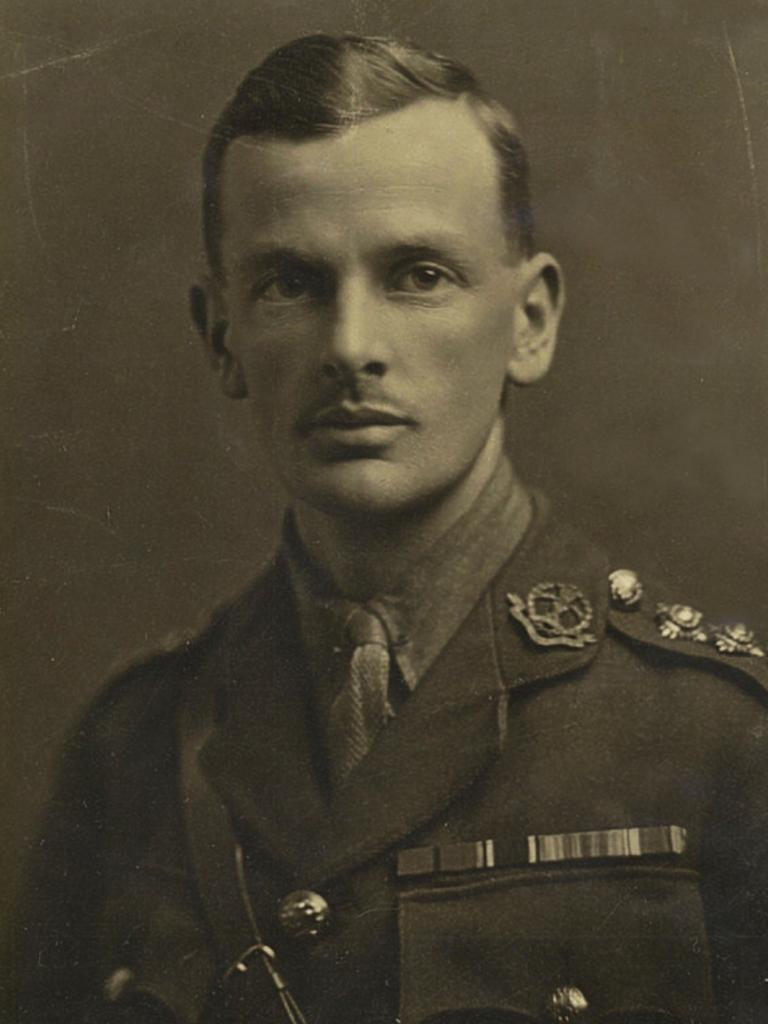
Dick Ellis in 1919

Following the outbreak of the First World War (1914–18), Ellis enlisted as a private in the 100th Provisional Battalion, headquartered in Aldeburgh, Suffolk, a unit of the Territorial Force and later known as the 29th (City of London) Battalion.

According to his biographer, Jesse Fink, Ellis ‘entered the actual "theatre of war" on 19 October 1916 in France, where he fought in the First Battle of the Somme commanded by Douglas Haig (which ended on 13 November 1916), got promoted to lance corporal (second-in-command of a section), [and] was repeatedly maimed.'

Wrote Ellis: ‘[I] served [on the Western Front] until the Somme battle finished, when I was given a commission and returned to England to work at the War Office and on censorship work in London and the Midlands. My department was in connection with Russian affairs, and the interesting character of the work induced me to take up the language. I worked at this in London and Paris for 13 months.’

Decades later, Ellis was awarded a Battles of the Somme Commemorative Medal.

After convalescing in a British hospital and further training in Troon, Scotland, Ellis joined the 4th Battalion Middlesex Regiment, was commissioned as a junior officer in September 1917, and later promoted to captain.

In 1918, Ellis left Europe for Egypt and India, via Italy. While stationed with the South Lancashire Regiment 1st Battalion in Quetta, he volunteered for the Intelligence Corps in Persia and Transcaspia. Ellis was later sent to Transcaspia as part of the Malleson mission against the Bolsheviks in what is now Turkmenistan.

Writes Fink: 'The original campaign to thwart German and Turkish incursions in Central Asia and India was two-pronged: Major General Lionel Dunsterville’s "Dunsterforce" led a British Indian Army brigade in Baku, capital of the newly formed and oil-rich Azerbaijan, and Major General Wilfrid Malleson, assistant quartermaster-general for intelligence, focused on the area from Meshed in Persia to Merv in Transcaspia: a distance of about 400 kilometres. Ellis was appointed one of Malleson's three staff officers, or captains, accompanied by "a small guard of Indian cavalry"... but Malleson's primary aim switched to preventing the Bolsheviks from taking over the... Trans-Caspian Railway, or Central Asian Railway, which roughly followed the route of the old Silk Road from Samarkand (now part of Uzbekistan) west to Krasnovodsk (now Türkmenbaşy) in Transcaspia.'

On 20 September 1918 Ellis was alleged to have been present for the slaying of 26 Commissars in Baku, Azerbaijan, though he strenuously denied any involvement: ‘No British officer was in the vicinity, nor was any British officer or official aware of what was happening to the prisoners.'

The following year Ellis took part in the Anglo-Afghan War, was awarded an OBE (military) and joined the Foreign Office as liaison officer and King’s Messenger. He also applied to study at Oxford University.

=== Ellis on the Malleson mission ===
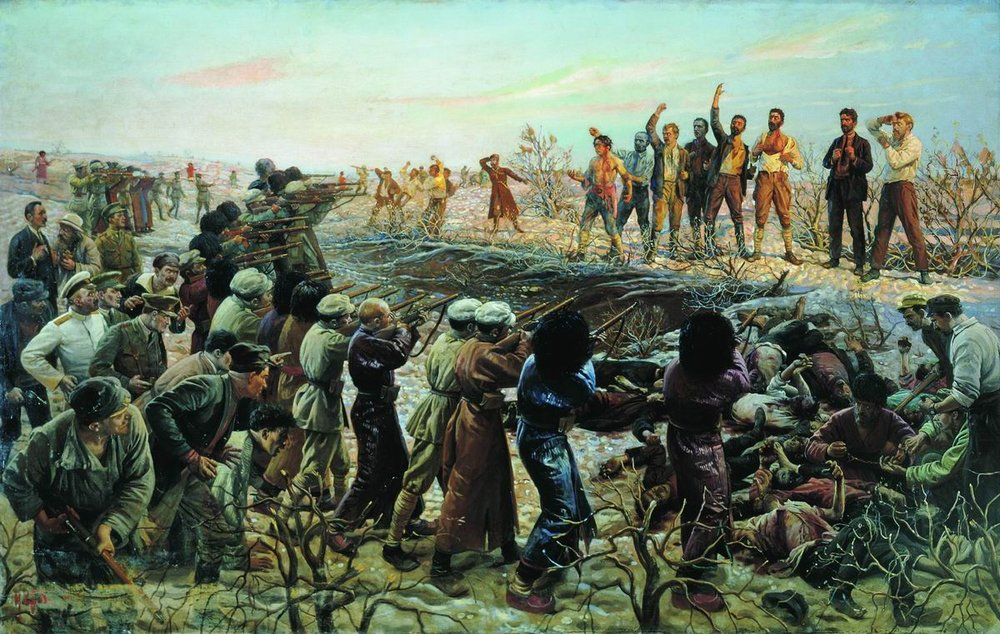
Isaak Brodsky's The Execution of the Twenty Six Baku Commissars Two British officers can be seen observing the shooting

In 1963 Ellis wrote a book about the Malleson mission titled The Transcaspian Episode, 1918–1919 (also released as The British 'Intervention' in Transcaspia, 1918–1919). Among the events addressed in the book was the 26 Commissars massacre. The commissars had earlier fled the Mussavatist Azerbaijan advanced guard in the September Days of 1918 just before the Turks occupied Baku. They planned to sail to Astrakhan, the only Caspian port still in Bolshevik hands but were instead dumped at the port of Krasnovodsk where they were summarily executed by the local Menshevik garrison. Ellis fundamentally disagreed with claims by the Socialist Revolutionary journalist Vadim Chaikin that British officers were responsible for the deaths of the Commissars, pointing out that it had been a triumph for Soviet propaganda. In a letter to The Times in 1961, Ellis placed the blame with the "Menshevik-Socialist Revolutionary" Transcaspian Government, which had jurisdiction over the prisoners. According to Ellis, the claim of British involvement arose only after the Socialist Revolutionaries found the need to ingratiate themselves with the stronger Bolsheviks.

== Pre World War II intelligence career ==
In October 1920, Ellis enrolled at St Edmund Hall, Oxford where he studied Russian. In November the following year he joined MI6 and was sent to Paris, France, and Constantinople, Turkey. He never finished his degree. On 12 April 1923, he married his first wife, Lilia Zelensky, in Constantinople.

In October 1923, Ellis was transferred to Berlin and became vice-consul at the British Passport Control Office, a cover for his intelligence work. MI6 historian Keith Jeffery writes in his official history of the service that Ellis worked for Frank Foley 'on the Soviet target’ and ‘was given a list of Russian agents to run and was himself approached by several White Russians who had heard of his transfer from friends in Turkey. Provided with little specific briefing or preliminary training – a typical experience for the time – Ellis was largely left to fend for himself and learn on the job. Afterwards he complained that desk officers at Head Office, who had no agent-running experience and seldom visited stations, knew very little about the realities of work in the field and frequently nursed unrealistic expectations of what could be achieved.’ Ellis and Zelensky had a son, Olik, in Berlin in 1924.

In 1926, Ellis moved to Vienna to work for station chief Thomas Kendrick under the cover of foreign correspondent for the Morning Post and in 1927 went to Geneva where he wrote a major book on the League of Nations called The Origin, Structure and Working of the League of Nations (1928). Although for long attributed to British-Finnish League official Konni Zilliacus, it has been proven that Ellis was the real author. According to Russian double agent Aleksandr Nelidov, Ellis's MI6 mission was to 'target Comintern [Communist International] agents in Europe... his main job had been to collect material about the Soviet Union from German sources in exchange for British information or for payments.'

In 1931, Ellis and Zelensky divorced and two years later Ellis married Barbara Mary Burgess-Smith in London. The following year they had a daughter, Ann. Throughout the 1930s Ellis was based largely in London. Ellis was made a fellow of the Royal Geographical Society in 1932. In 1938, with Captain Henry 'Bob' Kerby, Ellis was involved in MI6 wiretaps of Adolf Hitler and Joachim von Ribbentrop at the German Embassy in London. Ellis's job was to translate the conversations into English. Ellis also ran his own intelligence service, the 22000 Organisation, which existed parallel to Claude Dansey's Z Organisation. Keith Jeffery wrote that the 22000 Organisation's main tasks 'were the penetration of Germany and Italy... agents were recruited mostly from the business, journalistic and academic world'.

== World War II intelligence career ==
In June 1940 Ellis was appointed deputy head to William Stephenson at British Security Co-ordination (BSC) in New York, after the two men were introduced in 1938 in London by Sir Ralph Glyn. Ellis was officially appointed His Britannic Majesty's Consul in New York. He arrived in the United States in July that year.

Recalled Ellis: ‘[Stephenson] had been providing a great deal of information on German rearmament to Mr [Winston] Churchill at that time he was not in office [prior to May 1940] but was playing quite an important role in providing background information to members of [the] House of Commons who were much more concerned with what was happening than the administration [of Prime Minister Neville Chamberlain] seemed to be at the time.'

Stephenson had a ‘personal relationship with people like Mr Churchill and Lord Leathers and others' and, according to Ellis, 'I introduced him to my own channels, to heads of intelligence. And that led to his being asked if he was going to America... if he would do what he could to reestablish a link between security authorities here and the FBI.’

Agents recruited to BSC included Ian Fleming, Roald Dahl, Noël Coward and H. Montgomery Hyde.

Here, in the period before Pearl Harbor, Ellis briefed J. Edgar Hoover in counter-espionage techniques and provided the blueprint from which William J. Donovan was able to set up Coordinator of Information and the Office of Strategic Services. Ellis wrote a 14-page document for Donovan titled ‘Working of a secret service organisation’. CIA historian Thomas F. Troy described Ellis as ‘the tradecraft expert, the organisation man, the one who furnished Bill Donovan with charts and memoranda on running an intelligence organisation’.

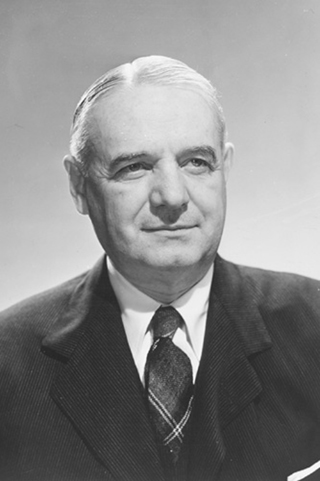
William Donovan

Ellis was also present when Dusko Popov warned J. Edgar Hoover of the impending Japanese attack on Pearl Harbor and claimed William Stephenson relayed those warnings to President Franklin D. Roosevelt.

‘[Stephenson] was convinced from the information that was reaching him that this attack was imminent, and through Jimmy Roosevelt, President Roosevelt’s son, he passed this information to the President. Now whether the President at that time had other information which corroborated this... it’s impossible to say.’

Ellis continued working closely with Donovan and OSS during 1942 and was involved in the setting up of OSS training centres and the infamous Camp X in Whitby, Ontario. In 1943 Ellis briefly went to Cairo, Egypt, where he served under Richard Casey but travelled frequently to the United States and Canada. In September 1944 he returned home to England but visited Washington, DC, in 1946 for talks with General John Magruder of Strategic Services Unit, the successor to OSS. It soon disbanded and the CIA was formed in 1947.

== Post World War II intelligence career and death ==
In 1946 Ellis divorced Burgess-Smith. The same year he was awarded a CBE by King George VI and the American Legion of Merit by President Harry S. Truman for his contribution to the Allied war effort in World War II.

His recommendation for the American award read:

During the period 1 January 1942 until the early part of 1943, Colonel Ellis, as liaison officer between the British Security Coordination in New York City and various intelligence services of the United States Government assisted in the firm establishment and growth of Secret Intelligence Branch of the Office of the Coordinator of Information (COI), predecessor of the Office of Strategic Services (OSS). He placed reservedly at our disposal his extensive experience with and intimate knowledge of the British Intelligence Service (SIS), of which he had been an officer for many years.

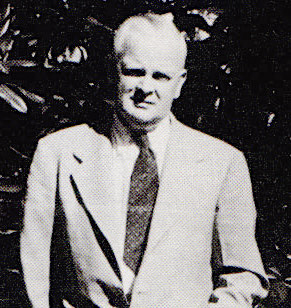
Dick Ellis after the war

He played a vital part in laying the foundation for an American counterpart of that organisation. Colonel Ellis’s assistance during the above period of experimentation and growth was invaluable particularly in the absence of any American precedent in the initiation and operation of a clandestine intelligence organisation.

Throughout the above period Colonel Ellis was a daily visitor to the COI (OSS) offices, where his helpfulness and advice were generously made available to the Secret Intelligence Branch. In addition he also furnished COI (OSS) many times of secret intelligence emanating from British sources. Such intelligence when turned over to the American Armed Forces and the various interested American Governmental Departments and Agencies proved to be of considerable value in the advancement of military plans and operations.

Ellis enjoyed 'a close and cooperative contact with various officials of the Office of Strategic Services, which has been of incalculable assistance to [the OSS]’.

His official citation, signed by President Truman, said: ‘Citation for the Legion of Merit, Degree of Officer. Colonel Charles Howard Ellis, O.B.E., British Army, performed outstanding services for the United States from August 1941 to May 1945. He gave unreservedly of his talent and wealth of information towards the development of certain of our intelligence organizations and methods. His enthusiastic interest, superior foresight and diplomacy were responsible in large measure for the success of highly important operations and to furtherance of Anglo-American cooperation.’

At MI6, Ellis was promoted to Chief Controller Pacific (Far East and the Americas), making him, in the words of Fink, 'effectively one of the most powerful intelligence agents in the world, with responsibility for North and South America and those regional hotbeds of communism, East Asia and South-East Asia'. Pincher said Ellis 'became No. 3 in the entire secret service hierarchy, controlling its activities in about half the world’. Ellis also headed MI6's Combined Intelligence Far East, based in Singapore and Hong Kong.

In the late 1940s Ellis went to Australia on behalf of MI6 and helped found the Australian Secret Intelligence Service. Ellis retired from MI6 in 1953 and accepted a two-year contract with the Australian Security Intelligence Organisation to act as a liaison between the Australian intelligence services and MI6. The same year he was awarded the CMG and TD. However Ellis returned to England on 11 February 1954. In August 1954 Ellis married his third wife, Alexandra Wood, and moved to Eastbourne, East Sussex.

He continued visiting Australia throughout the 1950s, '60s and '70s, primarily working on books, pamphlets and journal articles, with two unpublished manuscripts (Anglo-American Collaboration in Intelligence and Security: Notes for Documentation and The Two Bills: Mission Accomplished) forming the basis for H. Montgomery Hyde's The Quiet Canadian (1962) and William Stevenson's A Man Called Intrepid (1976). The latter book featured a foreword by Ellis. During the 1960s and into the '70s Ellis also worked as an officer for the International Documentary Centre (Interdoc), a Europe-based anti-communist organisation. In 1970 he was awarded the Sir Percy Sykes Memorial Medal from the Royal Society for Asian Affairs. His third wife, Alexandra Wood, died the same year. Ellis remarried again, to his fourth wife, Joyce Hatten, in 1973.

On 5 July 1975 Ellis, aged 80, died in Eastbourne.

== Espionage allegations ==
Following the defection of Kim Philby to the Soviet Union in 1963, Ellis was the subject of an internal MI5-MI6 investigation headed by Peter Wright's Fluency Committee and underwent interrogation in London, during which he allegedly made a confession that he had supplied information to the Nazis prior to World War II. He denied anything to do with the Soviet Union. The investigation was also known by the codename "EMERTON".

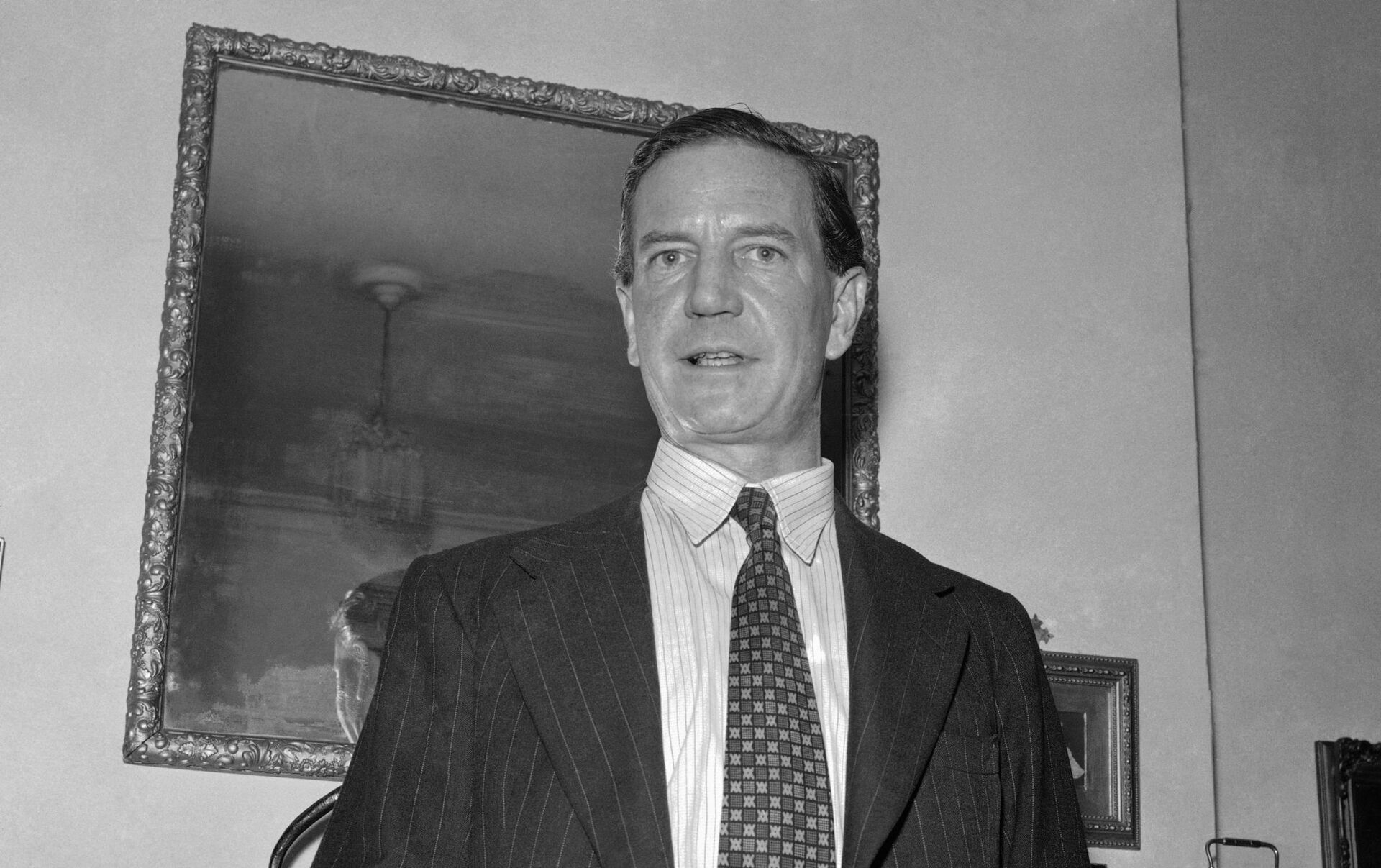
Kim Philby

CIA historian Thomas F. Troy stated that CIA counterintelligence chief James Jesus Angleton had warned him in 1963 that Ellis was under investigation as a suspected Soviet agent. The allegations made against Ellis featured in Chapman Pincher's books Their Trade is Treachery (1981) and Too Secret Too Long (1984) and Peter Wright's Spycatcher (1987). As a counterpoint, arguments have been put forward in Ellis's defence by a number of historians including Donald Cameron Watt, John Bryden, Stephen Dorril and Anthony Cave Brown, and intelligence agents Anthony Cavendish, Benjamin DeForest Bayly and Bill Ross-Smith.

In his history of MI6, Stephen Dorril concludes that though did sell information to Nazi Germany, "there is not a shred of real evidence" that he also spied for the Soviet Union.

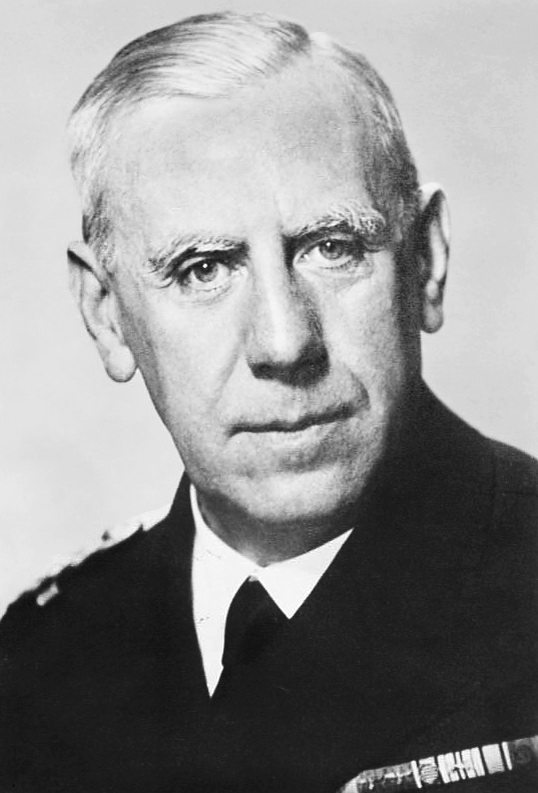
Admiral Wilhelm Canaris

British-Australian author Jesse Fink argues against the allegations that Ellis was a double agent in his 2023 biography The Eagle in the Mirror. Fink concludes that "without irrefutable proof of treason and judged on the breadth of his career, Ellis should be remembered not as a traitor but as one of the great intelligence officers of the 20th century whose character, loyalty, doggedness, reliability and vision marked him out as someone truly significant."

== Awards and honours ==
1919 Officer of the Most Excellent Order of the British Empire

1946 Commander of the Most Excellent Order of the British Empire

1946 Legion of Merit

1953 Companion of the Most Distinguished Order of St Michael and St George

1953 Territorial Decoration

1970 Sir Percy Sykes Memorial Medal

== See also ==
- Attack on Pearl Harbor
- British Security Co-ordination
- Franklin D. Roosevelt
- Inspirations for James Bond
- MI6
- Office of the Coordinator of Information
- Office of Strategic Services
- William J. Donovan
- William Stephenson
