= Noor (play) =

Play by Akbar Ahmed

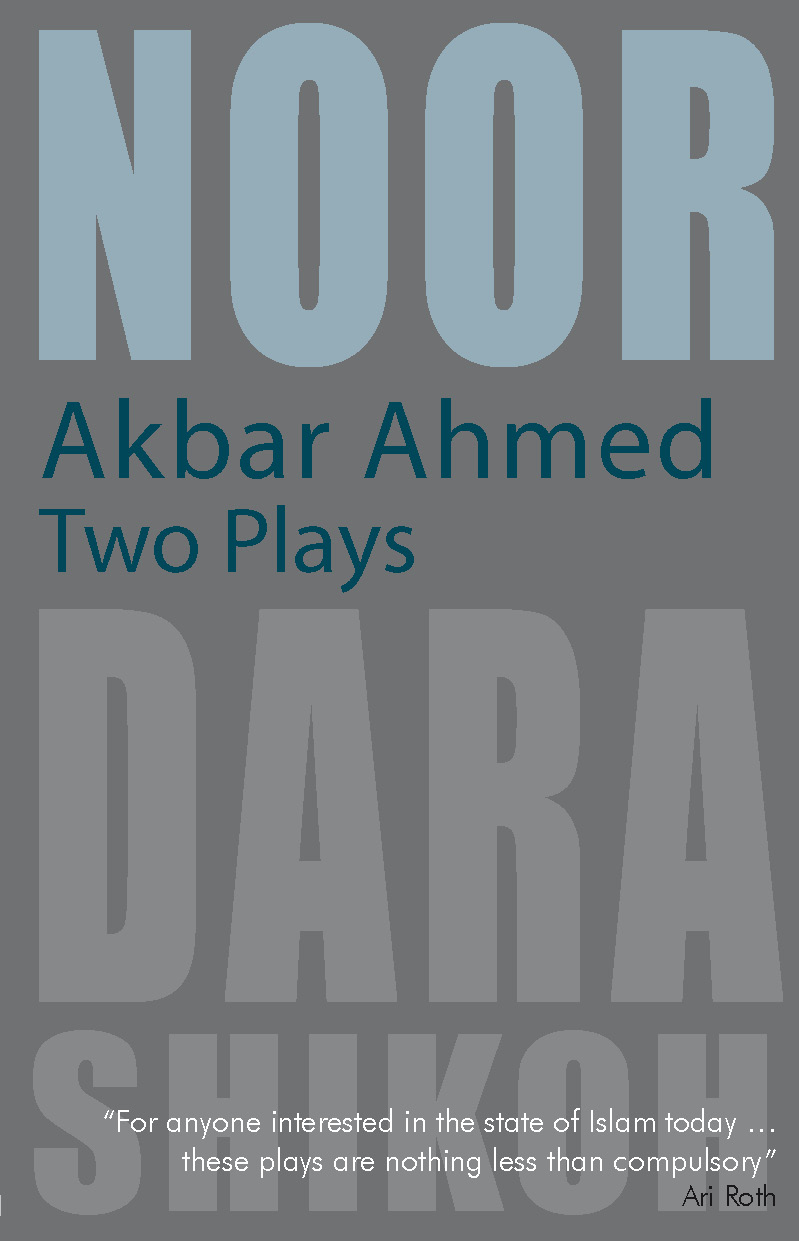
- First Edition 2009 Saqi Books
- Written by: Akbar Ahmed
- Characters: Abdullah; Daoud; Father Assad Hussein; Ali; Three soldiers Sheikh Moinuddin; Disciple; Deputy Minister; Flunky; Auntie Fatima; Fadel; Noor
- Original language: English
- Subject: Soldiers abduct Noor, a Muslim woman; Noor's three brothers debate what to do.
- Genre: Drama
- Setting: unnamed city with a Muslim-majority population, modern day.

Premiere
- Date premiered: 2007
- Place premiered: Theater J Washington, D.C.

Noor is a two-act play by Akbar Ahmed about the abduction of a young woman named Noor and her three brothers who represent currents inside modern Muslim communities: a Sufi, a secular government bureaucrat, and an angry fundamentalist.

== Characters ==
Main characters

- Abdullah (oldest brother, professor, idealistic Sufi)
- Daoud (middle brother, medical doctor, hardened religious literalist)
- Ali (youngest brother, lawyer and government bureaucrat, relatively secular)
- Father (Assad Hussain)
- Auntie Fatima (father's sister)
- Noor (youngest sibling, a bright college student)

Secondary characters

- Three soldiers
- Sheikh Moinuddin
- Disciple
- Flunky
- Fadel (truck driver)

== Plot ==
=== Act 1 ===
It is Ramadan. Daoud comes home and talks with his brother Abdullah. Soldiers of unknown background have abducted their younger sister Noor. Daoud is angry and blames Americans for this and most of the world's other woes. Abduallah urges calm and compassion. Ali returns and recounts the abduction of Noor and his own detention. Aggressive soldiers break into the house to search it, then leave. About Noor, Abduallah proposes consulting a Sufi sheikh. At the same time, Ali recommends he use his connections in a government ministry, and Daoud implies an act of violence would be the best response.

=== Act 2 ===
==== Scene One ====
In search of Noor, Abduallah consults a Sufi sheikh and Ali speaks with a government minister. Neither approach produces results.

==== Scene Two ====
Auntie Fatima, Noor's aunt and mother of Noor's finance Rahman, expresses concern that in detention Noor's "honor" may have been violated and has come to call off the engagement. The three brothers defend Noor and try to point out she loves Rahman and that love itself should triumph, and their father goes to talk to his sister Fatima. To bring back Noor, Abduallah prays, while Daoud blames "the Crusaders" and urges violence; they disagree about the true nature of Islam. Noor returns. She is strong and wise, and brings peace to the three brothers' disagreements.

== Performances ==
The play Noor premiered at Theater J in Washington, D.C., in 2007.
