= Peter Hopkirk =

British author (1930–2014)

- Born: 15 December 1930
- Died: 22 August 2014 (aged 83)
- Writing career
- Notable work: The Great Game (1990)

Peter Stuart Hopkirk (15 December 1930 – 22 August 2014) was a British journalist, author and historian who wrote six books about the British Empire, Russia and Central Asia.

== Biography ==
Peter Hopkirk was born in Nottingham, the son of Frank Stuart Hopkirk, an Anglican priest, and Mary Hopkirk (née Perkins). The family hailed originally from Roxburghshire in the borders of Scotland. He grew up at Danbury, Essex and was educated at the Dragon School in Oxford and at Marlborough College in Wiltshire. From an early age he was interested in spy novels carrying around John Buchan's Greenmantle and Ruyard Kipling's Kim. While at the Dragon School he played rugby and shot at Bisley.

During his national service, he was commissioned in the Royal Hampshire Regiment in January 1950 and served as a subaltern in the King's African Rifles, in the same battalion as Lance-Corporal Idi Amin.

Before becoming a full-time author, he was an ITN reporter and newscaster for two years, the New York City correspondent of Lord Beaverbrook's The Sunday Express, and then, for nearly twenty years, with The Times, five as its chief reporter, and later as a Middle East and Far East specialist. In the 1950s, he edited the West African news magazine Drum, sister paper to the South African Drum.

Hopkirk travelled widely over many years in the regions where his six books are set – Russia, Central Asia, the Caucasus, China, India, Pakistan, Iran, and eastern Turkey.

As a journalist, he sought a life in dangerous situations, being sent to Algeria to cover the revolutionary crisis in the French colonial administration. Inspired by Fitzroy Maclean's Eastern Approaches, he began to think about the Far East. He was based in New York during the Bay of Pigs fiasco in 1961, covering the events for the Daily Express.

Hopkirk was twice arrested and held in secret police cells. In Cuba, he was accused of spying for the US government and his contacts in Mexico obtained his release. In the Middle East, he was hijacked by Arab terrorists in Beirut, which led to his expulsion. At the height of the economic oil crises in 1974, Palestine Liberation Organization (PLO) personnel hijacked his plane, a KLM jet bound for Amsterdam. Hopkirk confronted the armed gang and persuaded them to surrender their weapons.

His works have been officially translated into fourteen languages, and unofficial versions in local languages are apt to appear in the bazaars of Central Asia. In 1999, he was awarded the Sir Percy Sykes Memorial Medal for his writing and travels by the Royal Society for Asian Affairs. Much of his research came from the India Office archives in the British Library (in London's St Pancras).

Hopkirk's wife, Kathleen Hopkirk, wrote A Traveller's Companion to Central Asia, published by John Murray in 1994 (ISBN 0-7195-5016-5).

Hopkirk died on 22 August 2014 at the age of 83.

== Awards ==
- Sir Percy Sykes Memorial Prize (1999)

== Works ==
- Foreign Devils on the Silk Road: The Search for the Lost Cities and Treasures of Chinese Central Asia, 1980
  - on early European explorations of the Taklamakan Desert
- Trespassers on the Roof of the World: The Race for Lhasa, 1982
- Setting the East Ablaze: Lenin's Dream of an Empire in Asia, 1984
- The Great Game: On Secret Service in High Asia, John Murray, 1990, ISBN 071954727X
  - The Great Game: The Struggle for Empire in Central Asia, Kodansha International, 1992, ISBN 1568360223
- On Secret Service East of Constantinople: The Great Game and the Great War, 1994 ISBN 0719550173
  - published in the US as: Like Hidden Fire: The Plot to Bring Down the British Empire, 1995
  - on plots by the Germans to raise Central Asia against the British during World War I
- Quest for Kim: in Search of Kipling's Great Game, 1996;
  - a travelogue to the locations of Kipling's novel Kim

Testimonials

Patrick Leigh Fermor in The Daily Telegraph nominated The Great Game for the Book of the Year. Edward Said in Punch magazine called it a "superb account" and the FT declared it to be "immensely readable and magisterial". Hopkirk, wrote Lord Longford, displayed "astonishing erudition."
