= Percy Sykes Memorial Medal =

The Sir Percy Sykes Memorial Medal was an award conferred by the Royal Society for Asian Affairs.

In 2025 the Royal Society for Asian Affairs renamed the Sir Percy Sykes Memorial Medal the RSAA Medal and changed the award criteria.

== History ==
The Sir Percy Sykes Memorial Medal was established in 1947 in honour of Brigadier-General Sir Percy Molesworth Sykes, honorary secretary 1924-1932. It was awarded to "distinguished travellers and writers deemed to have increased man’s knowledge of and stimulated interest in Asia." The medal was designed by Eric Kennington.

== Recipients ==
- 2019 Francesc Vendrell CMG (1940–2022)
- 2016 John Curtis and Vesta Sarkhosh Curtis
- 2015 Christoph Baumer
- 2013 Nancy Hatch Dupree
- 2012 Geoffrey Langlands
- 2011 Avi Shlaim
- 2009 John Keay
- 2007 Fred Halliday
- 2006 Shirin Akiner
- 2005 William Dalrymple
- 2004 Charles Allen
- 2002 Maurice Zinkin and Taya Zinkin
- 2001 Mark Tully
- 1999 Peter Hopkirk
- 1994 Akbar Ahmed
- 1992 Albert Hourani
- 1990 Denis Wright
- 1987 Charles F Beckingham
- 1983 Tim Severin
- 1980 David Stronach
- 1977 Basil Gray
- 1975 Cyril Philips
- 1974 Gunnar Jarring
- 1973 William Watson
- 1972 W E D Allen
- 1972 Giuseppe Tucci
- 1970 C H Ellis
- 1969 S C Sutton
- 1968 Violet Conolly
- 1967 C J Edmonds
- 1967 G E Wheeler
- 1965 C von Furer Haimendorf
- 1964 Laurence Lockhart
- 1963 Hugh Richardson
- 1962 Reader Bullard
- 1960 Ann K S Lambton
- 1958 Francis Tuker
- 1956 Douglas Carruthers
- 1955 Ella Maillart
- 1954 Tom Stobart
- 1951 Freya Stark
- 1947 Fakhri Dai Gilani
- 1941 Keppel Archibald Cresswell
