= Kipling Sahib =

Book by Charles Allen

Kipling Sahib: India and the Making of Rudyard Kipling 1865-1900
- Author: Charles Allen
- Genre: Biography
- Publisher: Little, Brown and Company
- Publication date: 2007
- Publication place: United Kingdom
- Pages: 448
- ISBN: 978-0-349-11685-3
- Dewey Decimal: 828.809

Kipling Sahib is a biography of Rudyard Kipling, by Charles Allen. It focuses primarily on Kipling's upbringing in India, and largely ignores his later life and work.
