= The Great Game (Hopkirk book) =

1990 book by Peter Hopkirk

The Great Game: The Struggle for Empire in Central Asia
- Author: Peter Hopkirk
- Original title: The Great Game: On Secret Service in High Asia
- Language: English
- Subject: History
- Publisher: John Murray/Kodansha International
- Publication date: 1990/May 15, 1992
- Publication place: United Kingdom
- ISBN: 978-1-56836-022-5

The Great Game: On Secret Service in High Asia (US title The Great Game: The Struggle for Empire in Central Asia is a book by Peter Hopkirk on "the Great Game", a series of conflicts in the 1800s between the UK and Russian powers to control Central Asia.

== Description ==
In this work, the author relates the story of a time best described by Captain Arthur Connolly, of the East India Company before he was beheaded in Bokhara for spying in 1842, as "The Great Game".

The Great Game was played between the Russian Empire and British Empire for supremacy in Central Asia. At stake was the preservation of India, key to the wealth of the British Empire. When play began early in the 19th century, the frontiers of the two imperial powers lay two thousand miles apart, across vast deserts and almost impassable mountain ranges; by the end, only 20 miles separated the two rivals.

== Najibullah translation ==
After the fall of Kabul to Afghan mujahideen forces in 1992, the last Soviet-backed president of Afghanistan, Mohammad Najibullah, sought refuge in the capital's UN compound. In 1996, when the Taliban took the city, they promptly seized and murdered him. However, during his time at the UN compound, he began translating The Great Game into his mother tongue Pashto, so that "They [Afghans] can see how our history has repeated itself...Only if we understand our history can we take steps to break the cycle". Years later, Hopkirk was quoted as saying, "I’m not sure what became of Najibullah’s translation...I know that it found its way to India where his wife and children had been given asylum. Sadly, after that the trail goes cold.”
