= Violet Conolly =

- Born: 11 May 1899; Fernville, Glasnevin, Dublin
- Died: 11 January 1988 (aged 88); London, United Kingdom

Dr Violet Marie Rose Conolly OBE (11 May 1899 – 11 January 1988) was an Irish authority on Soviet Russia and a traveller.

== Early life and family ==
Violet Conolly was born at Fernville, Glasnevin on 11 May 1899. She was the eldest of the six children of Thomas Conolly, a master builder, and Teresa (née McQuaid). She had four sisters and one brother. She attended the Holy Faith Convent, Glasnevin, and the Loreto Abbey, Rathfarnham. She graduated from University College Dublin with a BA in 1921. She moved to London working as a teacher, learning Russian and Italian in the evenings at London University. Later she traveled to Spain, working there as a governess, and then to Germany.

Conolly traveled extensively internationally, and she was planning a trip to the Andes just before her death. She lived in London for many years, but maintained her connections with Ireland, visiting family in Ireland frequently. Her brother, Thomas, was an expert in Irish constitutional law. Her sister Anne was married to politician Patrick McGilligan, and her sister Lillian was married to diplomat William Fay. Conolly died in London on 11 January 1988.

== Career ==
From 1925 to 1930, Conolly worked for the League of Nations in Paris. Working for the Institute of Current Affairs, she was based in Harvard and Geneva from 1930 to 1932. While in Geneva, she attended the Graduate Institute of International and Development Studies. She began working as a researcher at the Royal Institute of International Affairs at Chatham House in London from 1932, under Professor Arnold J. Toynbee. Conolly received a two-year Rockefeller scholarship, studying Persian at Berlin University, later touring the Middle East. She lived for a time in the Soviet Union studying economics, returning to Chatham House in 1938. That year, she spoke on Radio Éireann about "the foreign situation". She was appointed to the Foreign Office in London, and it was her work there during World War II which led to her specialising in Soviet affairs. She was appointed head of the Soviet (Russian) section of the research department at the Foreign Office after the war. She held this position until she retired in 1965. From 1946 to 1947 and 1952 to 1953, she was an economic attaché to the British embassy in Moscow.

Conolly continued her research in economic matters after her retirement in 1965. The Foreign Office frequently consulted her on affairs relating to Soviet policy. Many of her publications became standard texts, including her 1933 Soviet economic policy in the East: Turkey, Persia, Afghanistan, Mongolia and Tana Tuva, Sin Kiang. Encouraged to write a further volume, she wrote Soviet trade from the Pacific to the Levant, published in 1935. For her research she combed through Soviet files and cross-checked with published statistics, monitoring the Soviet press "for the disclosures of the special correspondent who almost invariably let the cat out of the bag of fiction". She went on to write Soviet tempo, a journal of travel in Russia (1937), Beyond the Urals (1967), and Russia enters the twentieth century 1894–1917 (1971). Theodore Shabad praised her "perceptive sifting of Soviet data" and her use of Soviet periodicals and regional papers. Her 1975 Siberia, today and tomorrow confirmed her as an authority on Siberian issues, leading her to be one of the 12 scholars invited to University of Lancaster for the founding conference of the British Universities Siberian Studies Seminar.

She received an honorary D.Econ.Sc. in 1936 from the National University of Ireland. She was awarded the Percy Sykes memorial medal from the Royal Central Asian Society in 1968, of which she was a member.
