= Royal Society for Asian Affairs =

Learned society promoting Asian countries

- Formation: 1901
- Type: Learned society
- Headquarters: London
- Location: United Kingdom
- Official language: English
- President: Peter Frankopan
- Website: rsaa.org.uk

The Royal Society for Asian Affairs (RSAA) is a learned society based in London (United Kingdom). Its objective is to advance public knowledge and understanding of Asia through its worldwide networks, its public events, its publications and its support to research. It is independent of governments and political bodies and does not take institutional positions on issues of policy at its meetings or in its publications.

The Society was founded in 1901 as the Central Asian Society to "promote greater knowledge and understanding of Central Asia and surrounding countries". The geographical extent of the society's interest has since expanded to include the whole of Asia. Taylor & Francis publishes the society's journal, Asian Affairs, which has been in print since 1914.

== History ==
The society was founded in 1901 to promote greater knowledge and understanding of Central Asia and surrounding countries. But although Central Asia dominated the Society’s early interests, from the outset its members took the view that any Asian developments that could have a bearing on British interests in Central Asia fell within the Society’s remit. So when, in 1975, the Society changed its name to the Royal Society for Asian Affairs, it was acknowledging in its name what had been the practical reality since its earliest days.

== Activities ==
Meetings were traditionally held at a range of central London locations including the Royal Astronomical Society, the Society of Antiquaries, the Medical Society of London and the Army and Navy Club. Since the start of the COVID-19 pandemic, all RSAA activities are online and many are open to the general public. Lectures are given by authoritative speakers roughly every two weeks on current affairs, history, culture and travel connected with all parts of Asia. Members of the Society receive the Society's journal, Asian Affairs, and have free access to the entire back catalogue. They also have access to other events and social functions.

=== Education ===
The Society's library and archive are currently inaccessible to researchers.

The journal of the society, Asian Affairs, is published quarterly by Taylor and Francis. It has been continuously in publication since 1914. It contains original articles and book reviews.

The Society has for many years run Schools' days jointly with the School of Oriental and African Studies, London for sixth-form students. These offer interested A-level students an opportunity to hear talks on a wide range of Asian topics and to try out a variety of Asian languages.

Through travel awards to young people, the RSAA supports practical projects and research that have the potential to contribute to advances in scholarly or other public knowledge including, but not limited to, post-graduate degrees, journalism and travel writing.

=== Awards ===
The Royal Society for Asian Affairs awards the RSAA Medal. Previously it awarded the Sir Percy Sykes Memorial Medal (named for Percy Sykes, honorary secretary 1924–1932) and the Lawrence Memorial Medal, named for T. E. Lawrence, to individuals who have distinguished themselves in their contribution to cultural relations, exploration, research, or literature. Both medals were designed by Eric Kennington.

The RSAA Medal was previously known as the Sir Percy Sykes Memorial Medal and was awarded under that name, but with different criteria. It was renamed in 2025. The Sir Percy Sykes Memorial Medal was established in 1947 and awarded to "distinguished travellers and writers deemed to have increased man’s knowledge of and stimulated interest in Asia". The Sykes Memorial Medal was last awarded in 2019.

The Lawrence Memorial Medal was established in 1935 to recognise "work of outstanding merit in the fields of exploration, research or literature" by British subjects. In 2025, the RSAA decided that since the medal was established to honour activities that were mainly connected with Britain's imperial past, and because it had consequently been awarded only infrequently in recent decades, it should be discontinued.

== Notable members ==
- George Curzon, 1st Marquess Curzon of Kedleston
- Ella Sykes, founder member
- Sir Percy Sykes, (28 February 1867 – 11 June 1945)
- Sir Harcourt Butler, (1 August 1869 – 2 March 1938)
- Sir Francis Younghusband, (31 May 1863 – 31 July 1942)
- K. P. S. Menon (October 18, 1898 – November 22, 1982)
- Vyvyan Holt (1887–1960), diplomat and Oriental scholar, who was captured during the Korean War
- William Anthony Furness, 2nd Viscount Furness (31 March 1929 – 1 May 1995)
- Violet Conolly (11 May 1899 – 11 January 1988)
- Sir Wilfred Thesiger (3 June 1910 – 24 August 2003)
- F. M. Bailey [ (3 February 1882 – 17 April 1967)
- Sir Aurel Stein (26 November 1862 – 26 October 1943)
- Lt Col. Reginald Schomberg (1880-1958)
- Sir Olaf Caroe (15 November 1892 – 23 November 1981)
- Peter Hopkirk (died August 2014), writer and traveller
- Dick Ellis (died 5 July 1975), intelligence officer and author
